= Arnulf III (archbishop of Milan) =

Arnulf III (Italian: Arnolfo di Porta Argentea or di Porta Orientale) (died 1097) was the Archbishop of Milan from his election on 6 December 1093 to his death in 1097. He succeeded Anselm III only two days after his death. Along with Anselm III and Anselm IV, he was one of a trio of successive archbishops of Milan to side with the pope against the emperor in the late 11th and early 12th century.

Though he was invested by Conrad II after his election, the papal legate declared him a simoniac and deposed him. Consequently, he was never consecrated. Arnulf went into a brief retirement of penance at the Abbey of San Pietro al Monte at Civate, where Anselm III had gone for a similar reason during his episcopate. After his brief sojourn there, he was reconciled with Pope Urban II and received the pallium. According to Pandulf of Pisa, this was the moment of his consecration. Bernold of Constance places his consecration in March 1095. It was performed by three great bishops of the German Gregorian Reform: Thimo of Salzburg, Odalric of Passau, and Gebhard III of Constance.

Arnulf became an enthusiastic reformer and opponent of the Emperor Henry IV. He participated in the Council of Piacenza. From 6 to 26 May that same year (1095), the pope was present at Milan for the transferral of the relics of Erlembald to S. Dionigi. In 1096, the pope preached the First Crusade at S. Tecla in Milanese territory. Only two of Arnulf's acts as bishop survive and he is buried in the Abbey of San Pietro al Monte at Civate. His exile or burial there probably prompted a burst of artistic activity, with frescos and sculptures that remain unusually intact.

== Sources ==
- Landolfo Iuniore di San Paolo. Historia Mediolanensis.
- Ghisalberti, Alberto M. Dizionario Biografico degli Italiani: III Ammirato – Arcoleo. Rome, 1961.
