= Abbey of San Pietro al Monte =

Coordinates: 45.834795°N 9.319303°E

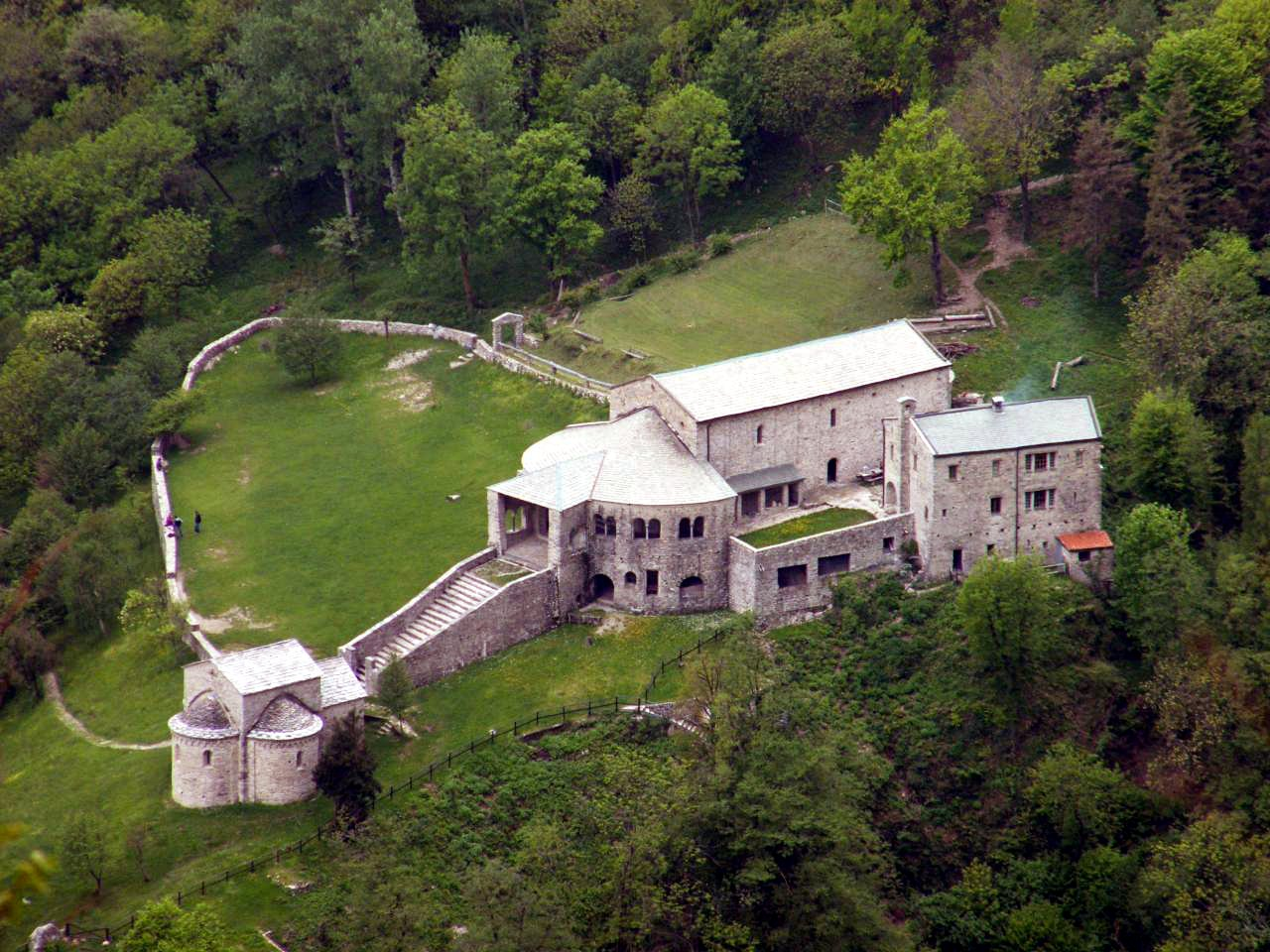
Complex of Abbazia di San Pietro al Monte

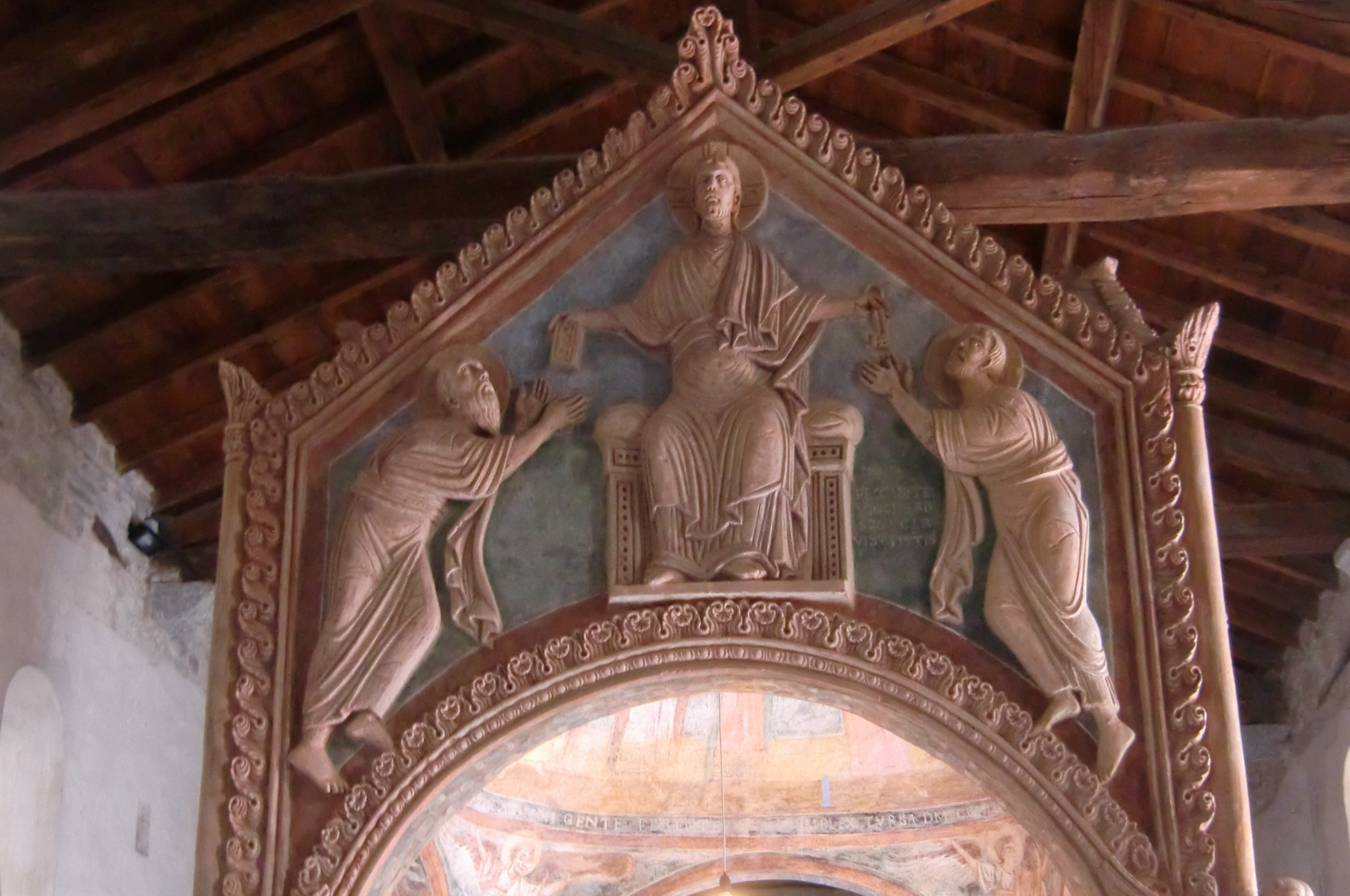
Stucco relief on the ciborium at the abbey

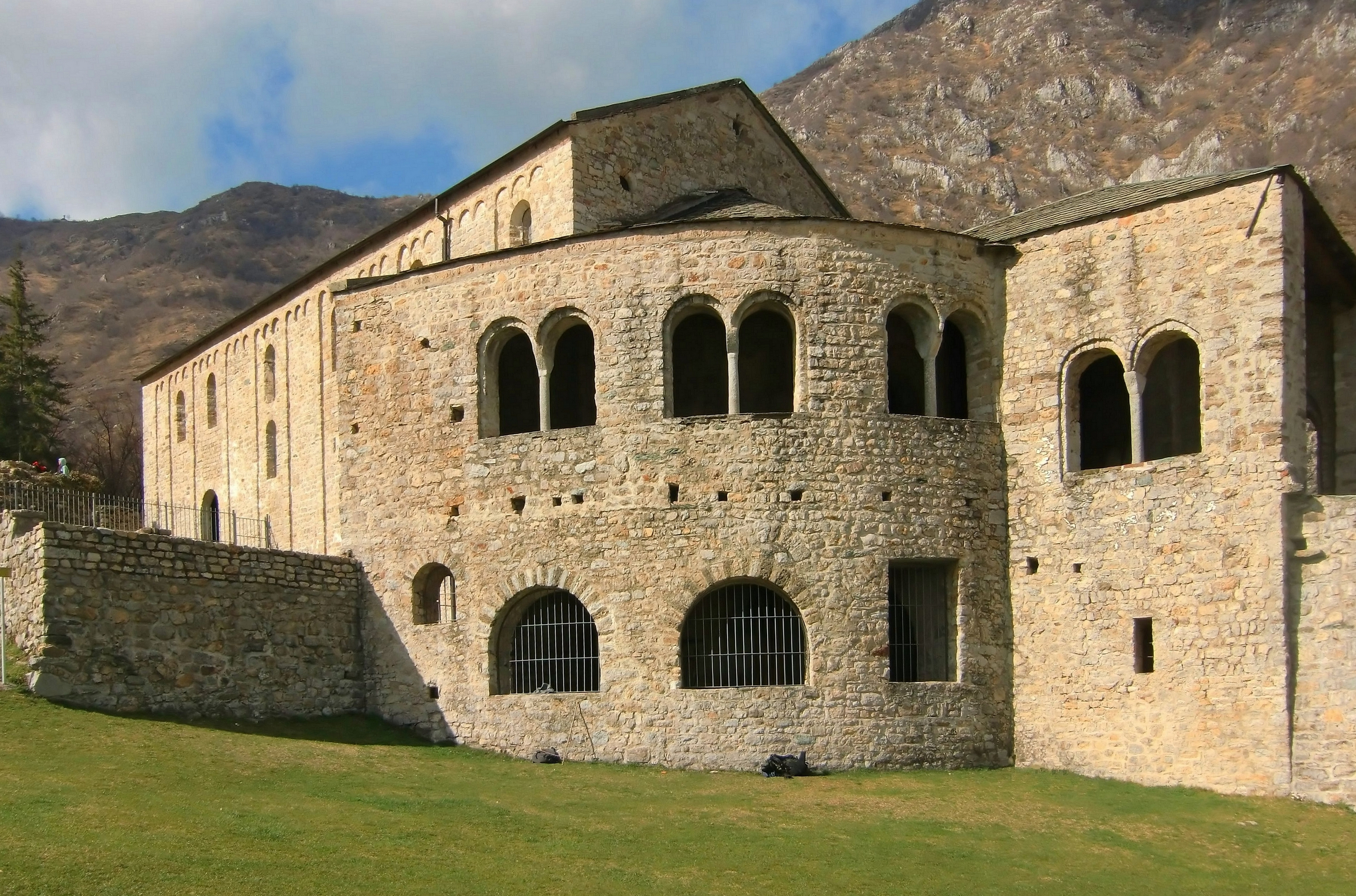
Abbey of San Pietro al Monte

The Abbey of San Pietro al Monte is a small medieval monastic complex mostly dating to the 11th century, in Lombard Romanesque style, on a hill outside the town of Civate, province of Lecco, in northern Italy.

Founded in 796 as a small hermitage by the Lombard king Desiderius, the complex was considerably expanded in the 11th century, and then left alone in terms of major building and decorating. It was secularized in the aftermath of the French Revolution. Its 11th-century features remain very largely intact, including many frescos and carved reliefs.

In 2016 it was added to the "tentative" list to be a UNESCO World Heritage Site, as part of a group of eight Italian medieval Benedictine monasteries, representing "The cultural landscape of the Benedictine settlements in medieval Italy".

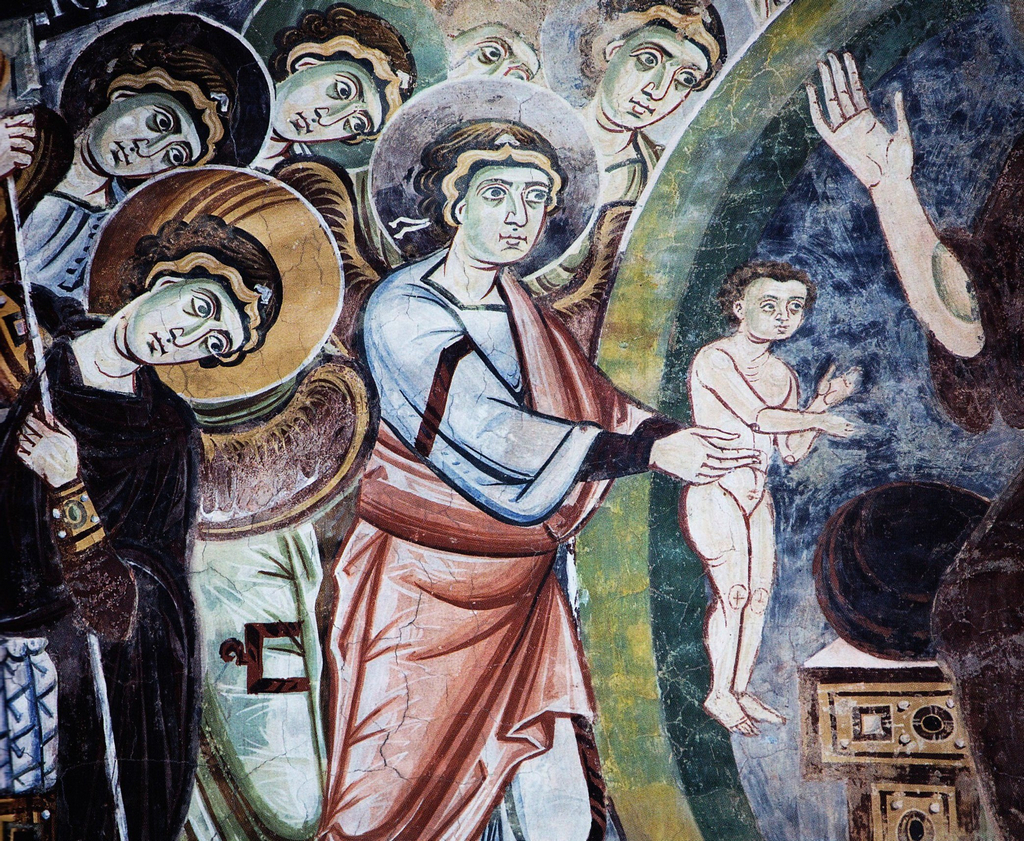
Detail of the frescos, 1090s

== Description ==
The site, presently not occupied by religious, consists of three buildings: the Basilica of San Pietro, an oratory dedicated to St. Benedict, and what was the monastery. The buildings were part of the Benedictine abbey complex of Civate, the Basilica of San Calocero and the churches of San Nazario and San Vito. Two stone portals include carvings above them. The frescoes of the 1090s in the basilica of St. Peter, whose subject is the final apotheosis of Christ and the Triumph of the Righteous, following the Book of Revelation, makes it one of the most important Lombard Romanesque sites.

The ciborium in the basilica has important reliefs in stucco.

Both Anselm III, Archbishop of Milan from 1086 to 1093, and his successor Arnulf III (d. 1097) lived at the monastery for periods, using it as a refuge in the turbulent 1080s and 1090s; Arnulf III died and is buried there. The expansion no doubt owed much to their presence.

== Bibliography ==
- A. Giussani L'abbazia benedettina di S. Pietro al Monte sopra Civate - Corno 1912
- O. Zastrow L'arte romanica nel comasco, Lecco - Casa editrice Stefanoni 1972
- C. Marcora Gli stucchi di S. Pietro al Monte sopra Civate, Lecco 1974
- V. Gatti Abbazia benedettina di S. Pietro al Monte Pedale sopra Civate, Milano - Note Guida 1980 e 2011
- G. Bognetti e C. Marcora L'Abbazia Benedettina di Civate, Casa del Cieco 1957 e 1985
- C. Castagna In hoc monasterio quod dicitur Clavate, Oggiono - Cattaneo 1987
- C. Castagna Frammenti per un restauro, Oggiono - Cattaneo 1992
- P. Tentori Ipotesi di ricostruzione del fregio ornamentale sull'affresco esterno alla porta orientale di S. Pietro al Monte di Civate, Archivi di Lecco - (XVII) 3 1994
- A. Guiglia Guidobaldi, "Civate", voce dell'Enciclopedia dell'Arte Medievale, 1994, reperibile al sito Civate in “Enciclopedia dell'Arte Medievale” – Treccani
- C. Castagna Un monastero sulla montagna, Annone - Riga, 2007
- Monika E. Müller, Omnia in mensura et numero et pondere disposita. Die Wandmalereien und Stuckarbeiten von San Pietro al Monte di Civate (Regensburg: Schnell & Steiner, 2009).
- C. Castagna La Cultura di Civate, Oggiono - Cattaneo, 2011.
- C. Castagna ... e un monastero a valle, Annone - Riga, 2014.
- C. Castagna San Pietro al Monte: quarant'anni di amicizia nei suoi occhi, Annone - Riga 2015
- C. Castagna Il Principe e il Cinghiale, Annone - Teka 2015
- G. Luzzana I monumenti dell'abbazia di Civate alla luce del restauro, Annone - Teka 2015
