= Anselm III (archbishop of Milan) =

Anselm III (Italian: Anselmo da Rho) was the archbishop of Milan from his consecration on 1 July 1086 to his death on 4 December 1093. He reestablished order in the Ambrosian see after more than a decade of fighting between the pataria and the religious authorities and confusion over the succession to the bishopric.

Anslem was a relative of Arnaldo da Rho. It was more than a year after the death of his predecessor, Tedald, that Anselm was nominated archbishop by Henry IV. He was the last imperially-appointed bishop in Milan and originally opposed to the Gregorian reforms in order to maintain the integrity of the historical Milanese independence of the Holy See. Pope Victor III refused him the pallium, but he made peace with Pope Urban II in 1088, after a brief retirement to a monastery, and received the pallium. He always supported the concurrent Cluniac reforms, however. In his first year in office, he founded a Cluniac nunnery at Cantù. Early in 1093, he renounced control of S. Maria in Calvenazzo after it was donated to Cluny.

The Milanese citizenry strongly opposed the imperial pretensions of and agitated for Conrad the Emperor's son as their own king. Anselm duly crowned Conrad King of Italy in opposition to his father first at Monza then at Milan. He died very soon after the coronation and was buried in S. Nazaro in Brolo.

== Sources ==
- Landolfo Iuniore di San Paolo. Historia Mediolanensis.
- Ghisalberti, Alberto M. Dizionario Biografico degli Italiani: III Ammirato – Arcoleo. Rome, 1961.
