= Bamberg Apocalypse =

Manuscript

- Msc.Bibl.140, fol.10v
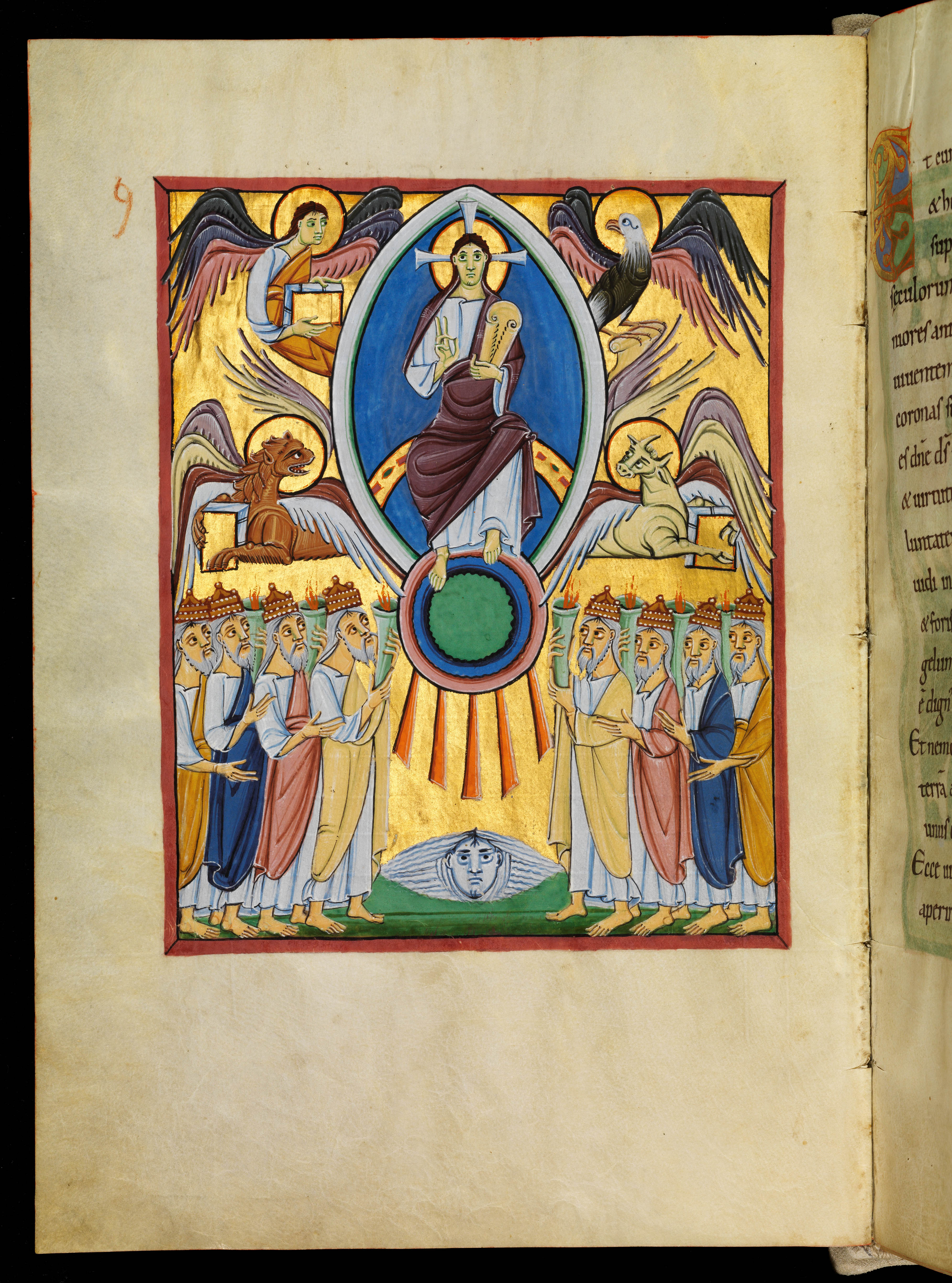
- Apc 4, 1-8
- Date: 1000-1020
- Place of origin: Reichenau Abbey
- Patron: Otto III, Henry II

The Bamberg Apocalypse (Bamberg State Library, Msc.Bibl.140) is an 11th-century richly illuminated manuscript containing the pictorial cycle of the Book of Revelation and a Gospel Lectionary of the books of pericopes. This medieval illuminated manuscript was created during the Ottonian dynasty; was probably commissioned by Otto III, although, by less accounts, Henry II. It was completed sometime between 1000 and 1020. There is proof that Henry II donated this illuminated manuscript in 1020 to Collegiate Abbey of St. Stephan, on the occasion of its inauguration. The Bamberg Apocalypse is now located in the Bamberg State Library.

== History ==
=== Origin ===
The date of completion is between 1000 and 1020. The Bamberg Apocalypse was created at the scriptorium at Reichenau.

=== Theme ===
The theme of this illuminated manuscript is the Apocalypse and commentaries on the Apocalypse by Beatus. Even though apocalyptic motifs are found in Early Christian art, there is no evidence of any existing apocalyptic manuscript until the Carolingian period. Apocalypse manuscripts were generally made in three different time periods: Carolingian, Ottonian, and Romanesque. The Bamberg Apocalypse belongs in the category of Ottonian Apocalypses. The Apocalypse was becoming an important theme not only to the elites but to the common believer during this period. Christians believed in the idea of Doomsday and believed it to be occurring during their era.

=== Patron ===
Many scholars debate over the patron of the Bamberg Apocalypse. It may have been commissioned by Otto III, who died suddenly in 1002, or by Henry II who may have found the unfinished work at the scriptorium and ordered its completion. Henry II, along with his wife, Cunigunde, donated the manuscript to the newly established Collegiate Abbey of St. Stephan at Bamberg.

== Description ==
=== Materials ===
The manuscript has 106 folios and is illuminated with 57 gilded miniatures and over 100 gilded initials. The dimensions of this illuminated manuscript is 29.5 x 20.5 cm In 2003 it, along with other Ottonian manuscripts produced at Reichenau, was added to the UNESCO Memory of the World International Register.

=== Illuminations ===
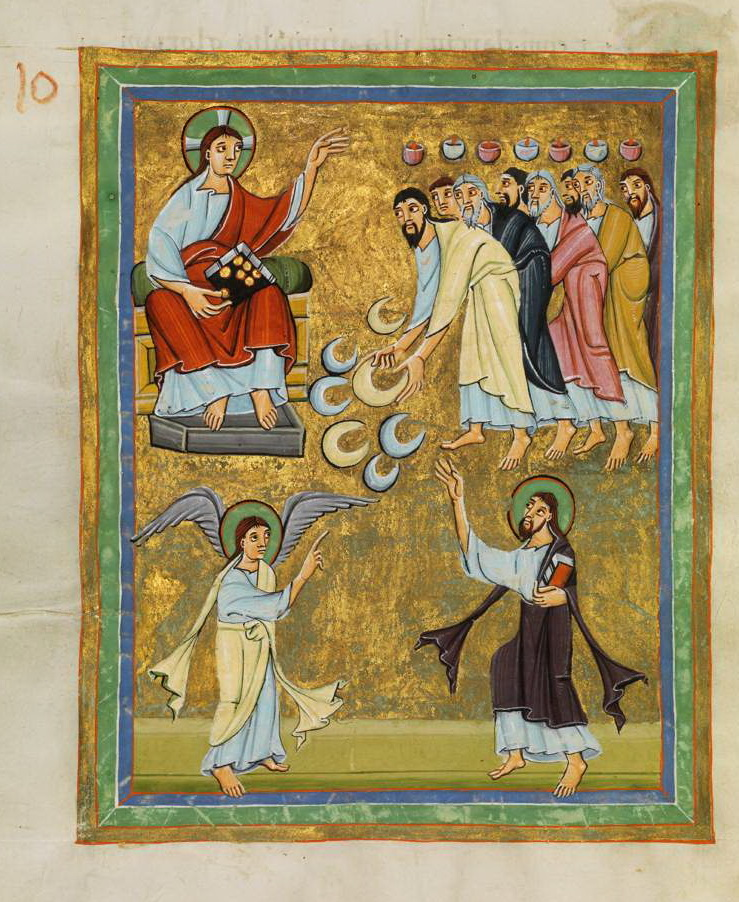
Bamberg Apocalypse

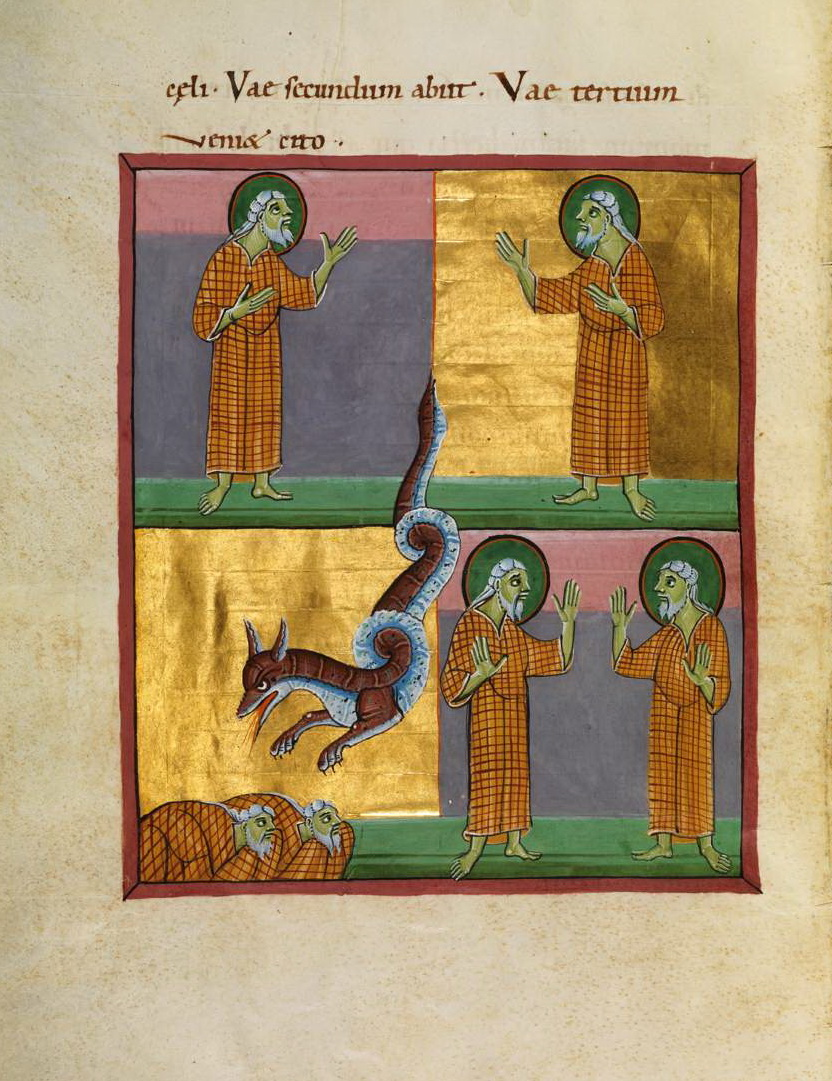
Bamberg Apocalypse

The style of the Bamberg Apocalypse is closely related to other Reichenau manuscripts including the Pericopes of Henry II and the Munich Gospels of Otto III. The Bamberg Apocalypse has attracted the attention of many scholars for its rich imagery and text. The Bamberg Apocalypse contains fifty miniatures in various sizes juxtaposed with Biblical text. There is a generous amount of gold in the background with figures in performative poses. This manuscript is also noted for the gestures used in the figurative narrative, especially in the hands. The iconography used in this manuscript can be traced to Valenciennes influence. However, the Bamberg Apocalypse stands out on its own for its innovative representations of biblical text. For example, this manuscript is credited to being the first surviving representation of the Last Judgement within a manuscript. On Folio 27v of the Bamberg Apocalypse is the first full depiction of Revelation 11 with a narrative divided into three key scenes. The figures on the top preach as the beast attacks two witness that then get resurrected on the bottom right register. The Bamberg Apocalyse is the only extant illustrated Ottonian Apocalypse manuscript.
