= Salzburg Pericopes =

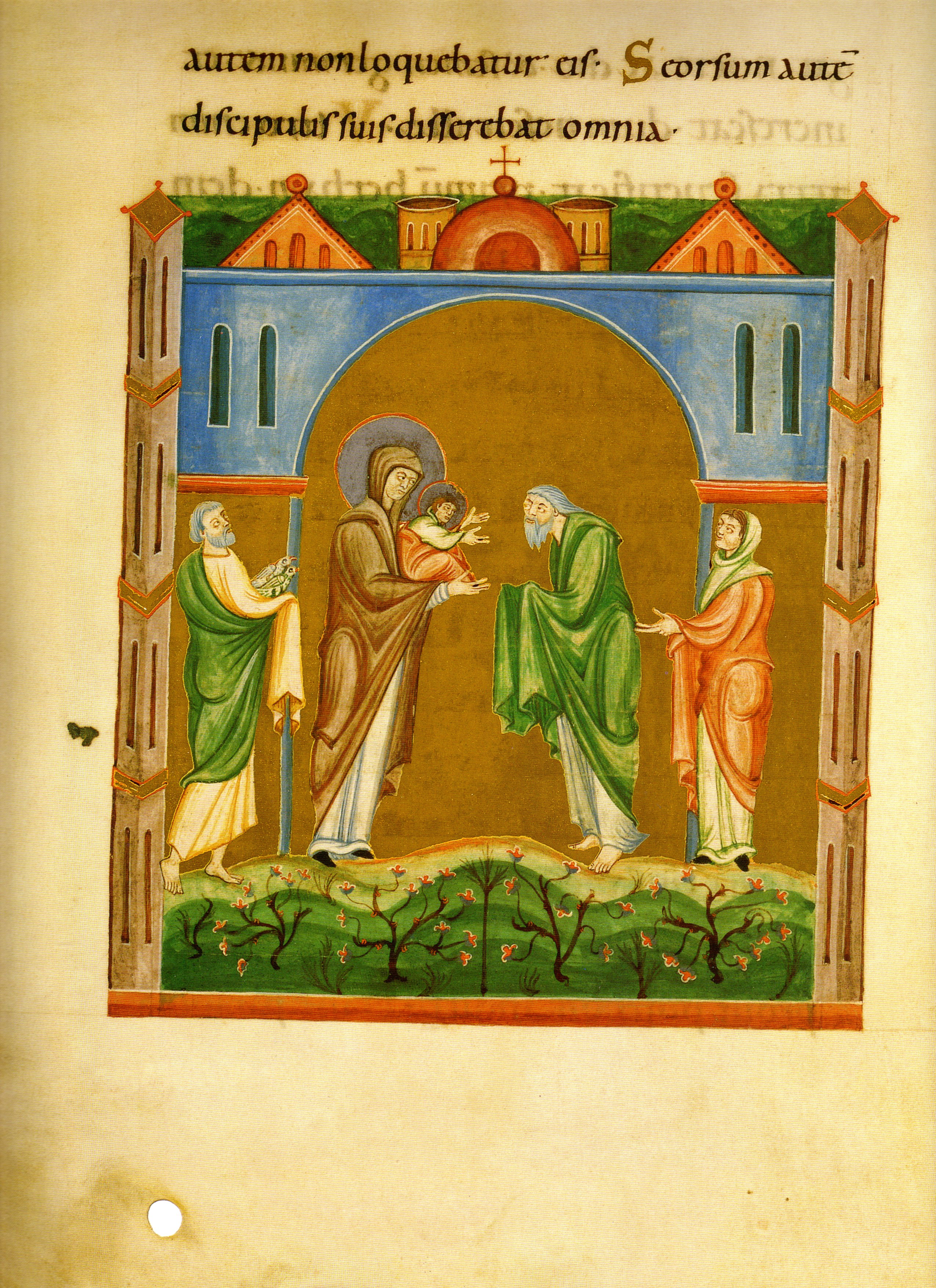
Folio 24 verso. Miniature of the Presentation of Christ in the Temple.

The Salzburg Pericopes (Bayerische Staatsbibliothek Clm 15713) is a medieval Ottonian illuminated gospel pericopes made c. 1020 at St. Peter's Monastery, Salzburg, during the reign of Henry II, the last Ottonian Holy Roman Emperor. It was made for Hartwig von Ortenburg, Archbishopric of Salzburg.

Unlike a gospel book, gospel pericopes contain only the passages from the gospels which are to be read during the liturgical year, making it easier for the priest celebrating Mass to find the gospel reading. The manuscript contains 19 gilded miniatures, 70 richly decorated initials in addition to other illuminations. The 70 extant folios measure 372 mm by 290 mm.

In 1800, Napoleon's forces took it to Paris from Salzburg Cathedral. It is now in the collection of the Bavarian State Library in Munich.

== See also ==
- Pericopes of Henry II
