= Miniature (illuminated manuscript) =

Picture in an ancient or medieval illuminated manuscript

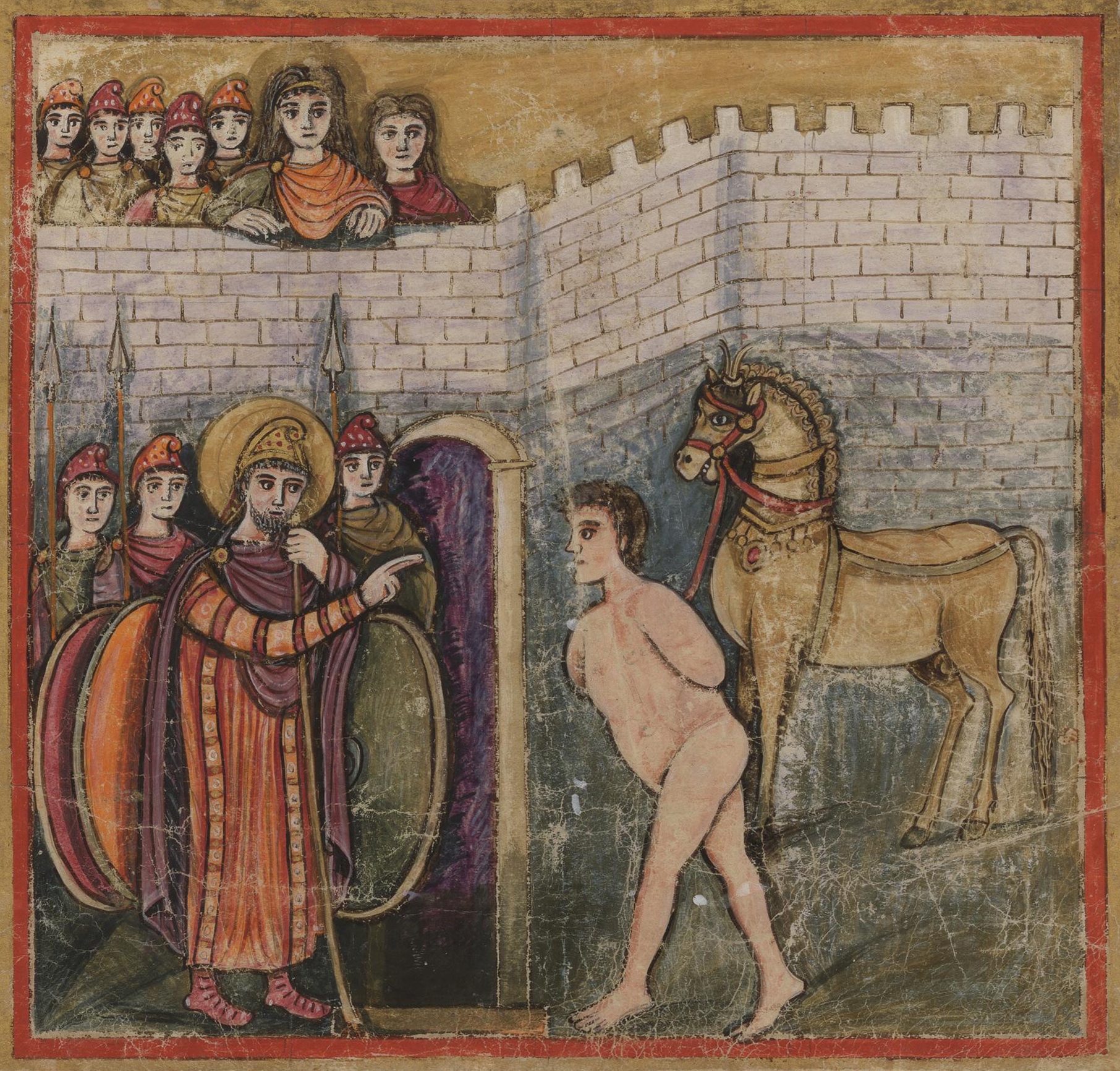
Miniature of Sinon and the Trojan Horse, from the Vergilius Romanus, a manuscript of Virgil's Aeneid, early 5th century

A miniature (from the Latin verb miniare 'to colour with minium', a red lead) is a small illustration used to decorate an ancient or medieval illuminated manuscript; the simple illustrations of the early codices having been miniated or delineated with that pigment. The generally small scale of such medieval pictures has led to etymological confusion with minuteness and to its application to small paintings, especially portrait miniatures, which did however grow from the same tradition and at least initially used similar techniques.

Apart from the Western, Byzantine and Armenian traditions, there is another group of Asian traditions, which is generally more illustrative in nature, and from origins in manuscript book decoration also developed into single-sheet small paintings to be kept in albums, which are also called miniatures, as the Western equivalents in watercolor and other media are not. These include Arabic miniatures, and their Persian, Mughal, Ottoman and other Indian offshoots.

== Christian traditions ==
=== Italy and Byzantium ===
==== 3rd–6th centuries ====
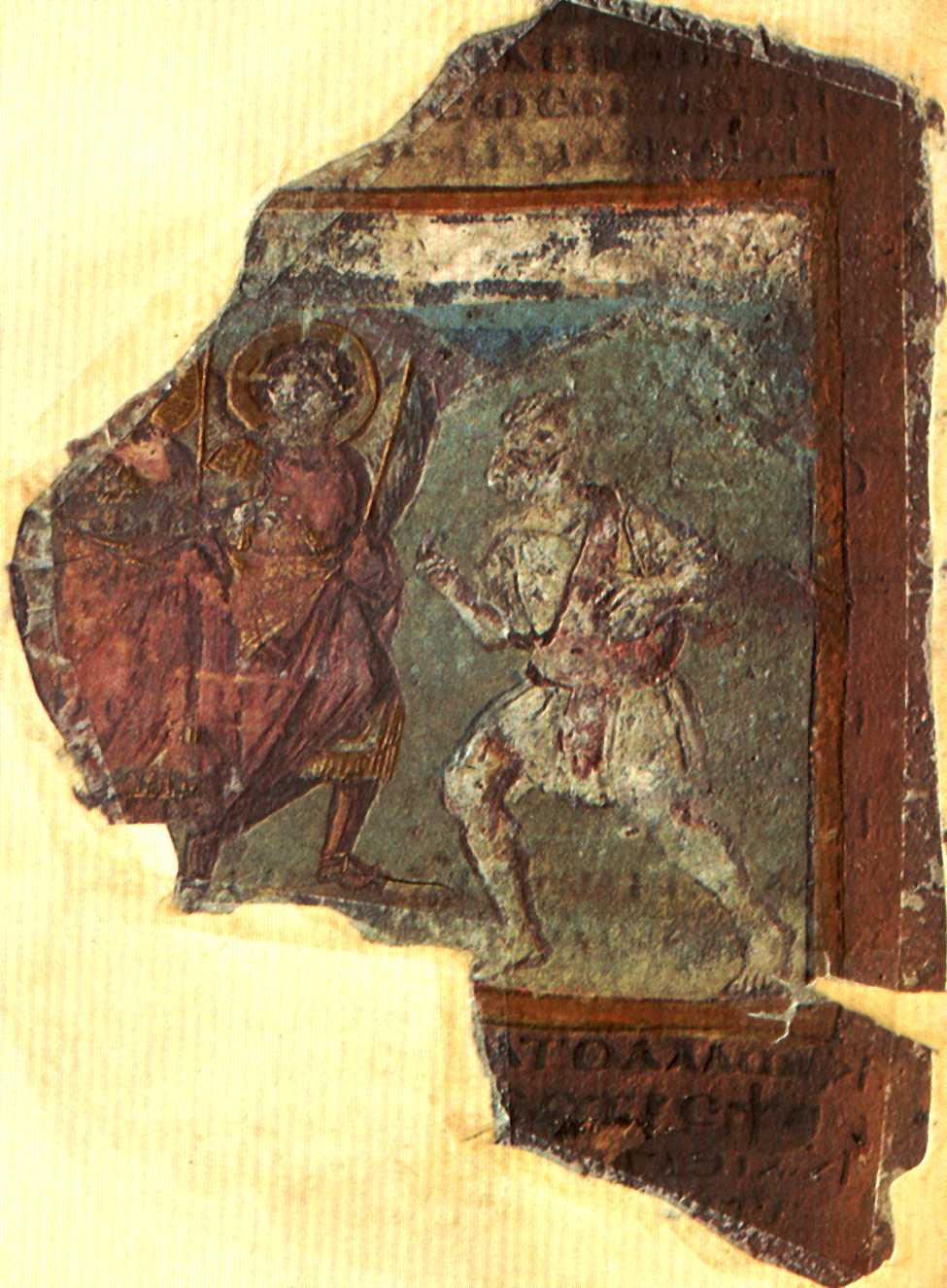
Miniature of Abraham meeting angels, from the Cotton Genesis, 5th–6th century.

The earliest extant miniatures are a series of uncolored pen drawings in the Chronograph of 354, which was lost after the Renaissance, but is known from copies. Fragments of some heavily illustrated luxury manuscripts from before about 450 have survived to the modern day. The Cotton Genesis was mostly destroyed by fire in London in 1731 and the Quedlinburg Itala fragments mostly destroyed in the Middle Ages, the vellum reused in bookbindings.

There are also colored miniatures cut from the Ambrosian Iliad, an illustrated manuscript of the Iliad from the 5th century. In these pictures there is a considerable variety in the quality of the drawing, but there are many notable instances of fine figure-drawing, quite classical in sentiment, showing that the earlier art still exercised its influence. Such indications, too, of landscape as are to be found are of the classical type, not conventional in the sense of medieval conventionalism, but still attempting to follow nature, even if in an imperfect fashion; just as in the Pompeian and other frescoes of the Roman age.

Of even greater value from an artistic point of view are the miniatures of the Vatican manuscript of Virgil, known as the Vergilius Vaticanus, of the early 5th century. They are in a more perfect condition and on a larger scale than the Ambrosian fragments, and they therefore offer better opportunity for examining method and technique. The drawing is quite classical in style, and the idea is conveyed that the miniatures are direct copies from an older series. The colors are opaque: indeed, in all the miniatures of early manuscripts the employment of body color was universal. The method followed in placing the different scenes on the page is highly instructive of the practice followed, as we may presume, by the artists of the early centuries. It seems that the background of the scene was first painted in full, covering the whole surface of the page; then, over this background were painted the larger figures and objects; and over these again the smaller details in front of them were superimposed. (The painter's algorithm.) Again, for the purpose of securing something like perspective, an arrangement of horizontal zones was adopted, the upper ones containing figures on a smaller scale than those below.

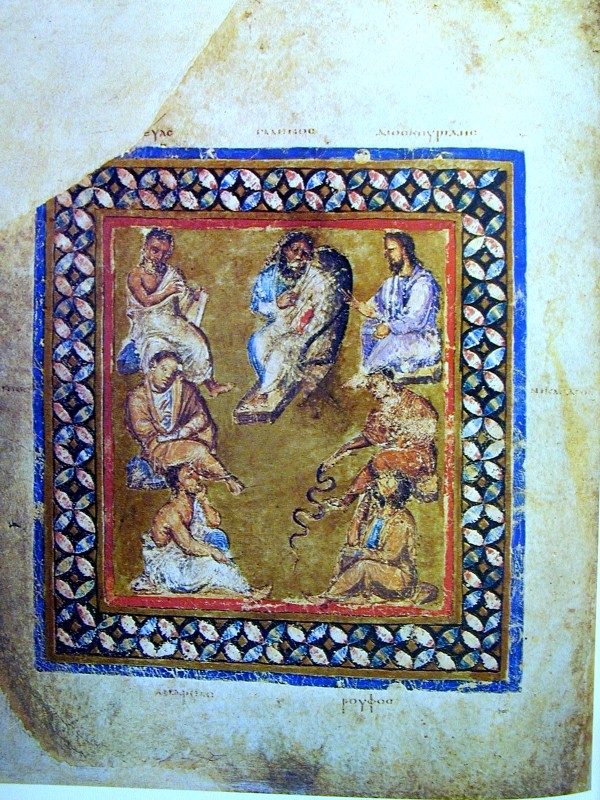
Miniature of seven physicians from the Vienna Dioscurides, early 6th century.

It was reserved for the Byzantine school to break away more decidedly from the natural presentment of things and to develop artistic conventions. Yet in the best early examples of this school the classical sentiment still lingers, as the relics of the miniatures of the Cotton Genesis, and the best of the miniatures of the Vienna Dioscurides testify; and in the miniatures of the later Byzantine manuscripts, which were copied from earlier examples, the reproduction of the models is faithful. But on comparing the miniatures of the Byzantine school generally with their classical predecessors, one has a sense of having passed from the open air into the cloister. Under the restraint of ecclesiastical domination Byzantine art became more and more stereotyped and conventional. The tendency grows to paint the flesh-tints in swarthy hues, to elongate and emaciate the limbs, and to stiffen the gait. Browns, blue-greys and neutral tints are in favor. Here we first find the technical treatment of flesh-painting which afterwards became the special practice of Italian miniaturists, namely the laying on of the actual flesh-tints over a ground of olive, green or other dark hue. Landscape, such as it was, soon became quite conventional, setting the example for that remarkable absence of the true representation of nature which is such a striking attribute of the miniatures of the Middle Ages.

And yet, while the ascetic treatment of the miniatures obtained so strongly in Byzantine art, at the same time the Oriental sense of splendour shows itself in the brilliancy of much of the coloring and in the lavish employment of gold. In the miniatures of Byzantine manuscripts are first seen those backgrounds of bright gold which afterwards appear in such profusion in the productions of every western school of painting.

The influence of Byzantine art on that of medieval Italy is obvious. The early mosaics in the churches of Italy, such as those at Ravenna and Venice, also afford examples of the dominating Byzantine influence. But the early Middle Ages provide but few landmarks to guide the student; and it is only when he emerges into the 12th century, with its frescoes and miniatures still bearing the impress of the Byzantine tradition, that he can be satisfied that the connection has always existed during the intervening centuries.

==== 13th–15th centuries ====
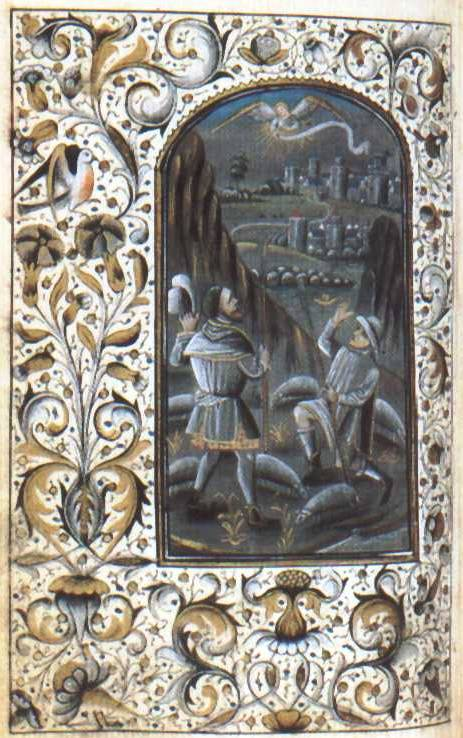
Miniature of the Annuciation to the Shepherds, from a Book of Hours (Milan, Biblioteca Trivulziana, Cod. 470).

The Italian miniature passed through the same stages as the miniatures of England and France and the Low Countries. Intercommunication between the countries of Europe was too well established for the case to be otherwise. In Italian manuscripts of the normal type the influence of Byzantine art is very manifest during the 13th and 14th centuries. The old system of painting the flesh tints upon olive green or some similar pigment, which is left exposed on the lines of the features, thus obtaining a swarthy complexion, continued to be practiced in a more or less modified form into the 15th century. As a rule, the pigments used are more opaque than those employed in the northern schools; and the artist trusted more to color alone to obtain the desired effect than to the mixture of color and gold which gave such brilliant results in the diapered patterns of France. The vivid scarlet of the Italian miniaturists is peculiarly their own. The figure-drawing is less realistic than the contemporary art of English and French manuscripts, the human form being often thick-set. In general, the Italian miniature, before its great expansion in the 14th century, is far behind the miniatures of the north. But with the 15th century, under the influence of the Renaissance, it advanced into the front rank and rivalled the best work of the Flemish school. The use of thicker pigments enabled the miniaturist to obtain the hard and polished surface so characteristic of his work, and to maintain sharpness of outline, without losing the depth and richness of color which compare with the same qualities in the Flemish school.

The Italian style was followed in the manuscripts of Provence in the 14th and 15th centuries. It had its effect, too, on the school of northern France, by which it was also influenced in turn. In the manuscripts of southern Germany it is also in evidence. But the principles which have been reviewed as guiding the development of the miniature in the more important schools apply equally to all. Like the miniature of the Flemish school, the Italian miniature was still worked to some extent with success, under special patronage, even in the 16th century; but with the rapid displacement of the manuscript by the printed book the miniaturist's occupation was brought to a close.

=== Armenian miniatures ===
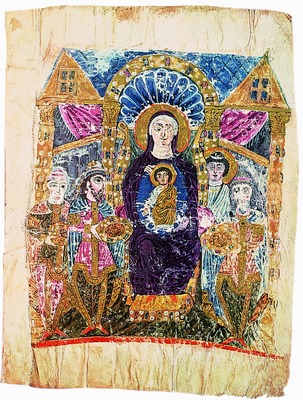
Ejmiadzin Gospel, 6th-7th centuries

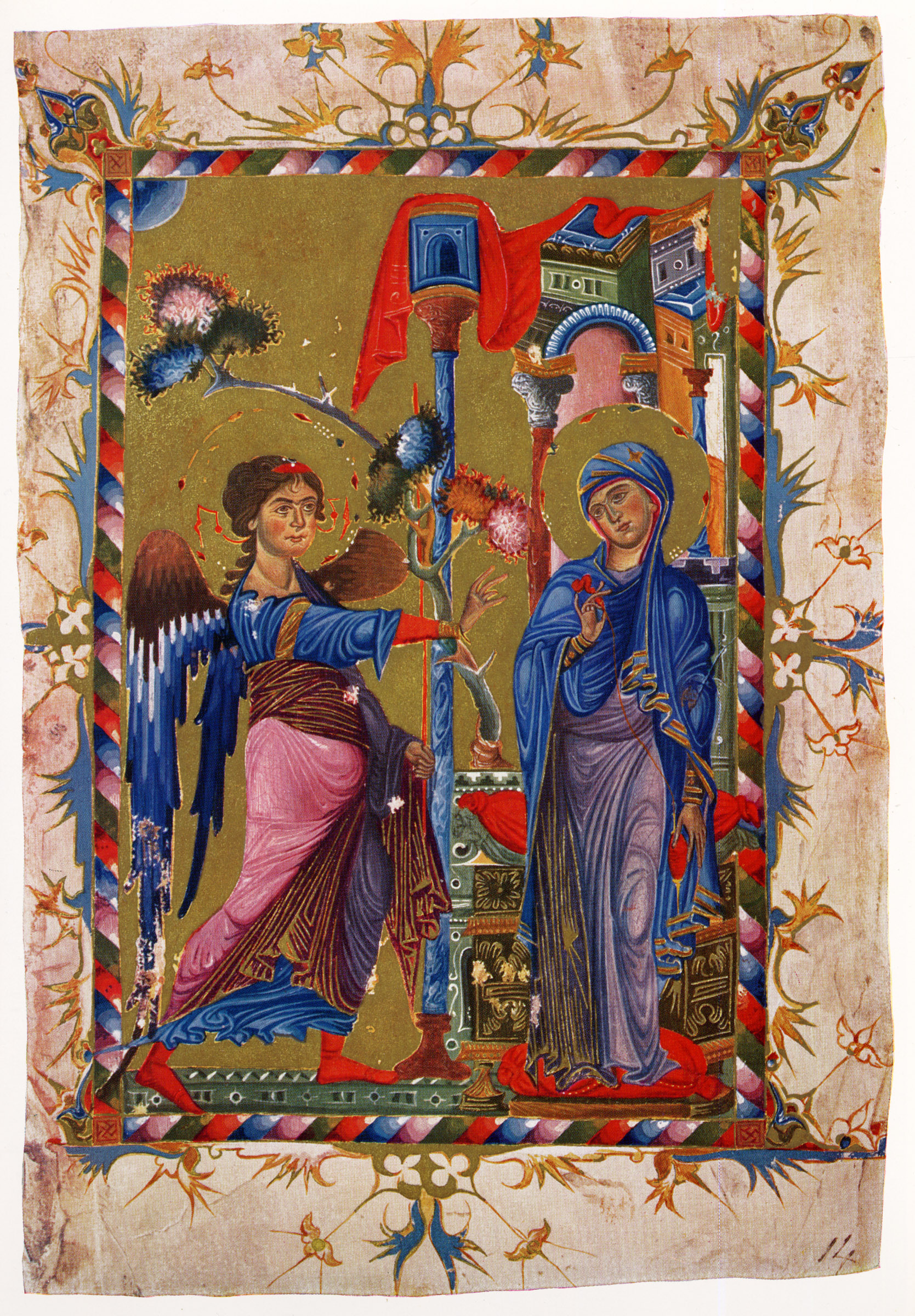
Miniature of 13th century

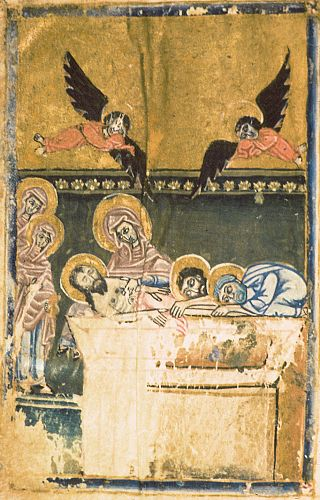
Miniature by Momik

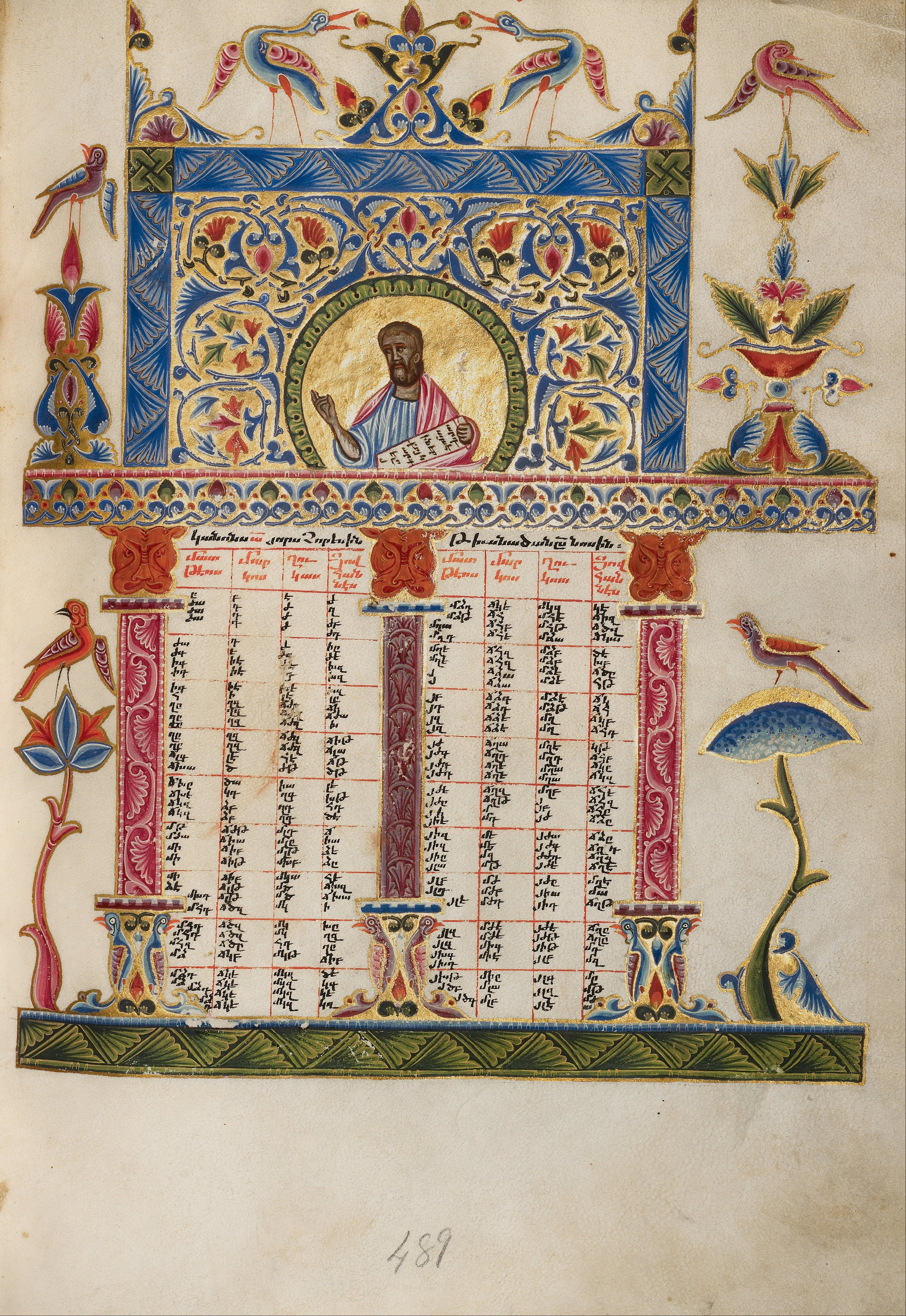
An Armenian manuscript by Malnazar from Gospel of 1637 - 1638

Armenian miniature painting stands out with its variety of styles and schools. When in 405 Mesrop Mashtots created the Armenian letters, Armenian manuscripts appeared, and Armenian miniature painting developed together with it. Most of the 25,000 Armenian manuscripts from different centuries are decorated with miniatures.

Books with religious content were mostly decorated, however, the miniature artists, or "flourishers", as they were called at the time, were able to express their emotions and feelings and to reflect real life scenes through religious themes. Especially in capital letters at the beginning of the text, in the ornaments placed before the title or in the pictures made in the margins, in the decorated letters, they introduced various images and elements of flora and fauna.

In Armenian miniatures one can find scenes depicting hunting, animal fighting, theatrical performances, other scenes of urban and rural life, portraits of famous figures of the time, commissioners of manuscripts. Such miniatures are of great importance for the study of the life and lifestyle of medieval Armenia, costumes, manners, crafts, Armenian nature. Some miniature painters also left their self-portraits.

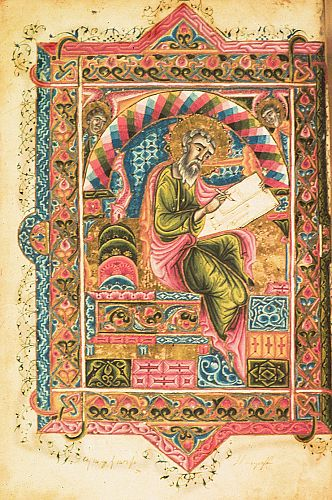
Saint Mathew by Hakob of Julfa, Gospel of 1610 (Matenadaran, Ms. 7639).

Many miniature painting centers operated in Armenia at different times. There are well-known centers, such as those of Ani, Gladzor, Tatev, Nakhichevan, Artsakh, Vaspurakan, each of which, in addition to the general features typical of national art, is characterized by a unique style of miniature painting and local traditions. Later miniature painting centers were established in Armenian colonies as well.

Armenian miniature art flourished in the 13th century, especially in Cilician Armenia, where the miniatures were more luxurious and elegant. Works of such talented miniature artists of different times and centers as Toros Roslin, Grigor, Ignatius, Sargis Pitsak, Toros Taronetsi, Avag, Momik, Simeon Archishetsi, Vardan Artsketsi, Kirakos, Hovhannes, Hakob Jughayetsi and may more have weathered the march of times up to now. Yet names of many other miniature artists have not been preserved.

Armenian miniature painting has gone through long and difficult historical paths; it is a witness of Armenian's unparalleled creative zeal, which neither the countless disasters brought by foreign invaders, nor the difficult and torturous migration routes were able to extinguish. With its originality, mastery of performance, extraordinary color, richness and variety of jewelry, it occupies a unique and honorable place not only in the treasury of national art, but also in the world art.

The Gospels were the most illustrated, followed by the Bible and other religious collections. The first miniatures that have reached us are samples of the 6th-7th centuries. The types of characters and painting in them are reminiscent of the frescoes of Lmbat and Aruch from the 7th century. The "Gospel of Queen Mlke", "The Gospel of Kars", "The Gospel of Trabzon" have survived from the period of the kingdoms of Bagratuni and Artsruni. These manuscripts contain the main features of the further development of Armenian miniature painting: • columnar tabernacles, • gold leaflets with capital letters, • Lord's pictures, that is the events of Christ's life, which are mentioned in the church holidays, • miniatures attached to the text. An organic combination of Byzantine and all-Christian art can be found in them, in the depictions of arches of the tabernacles of the "Gospel of Queen Mlke", Egyptian motifs, architectural decor of evangelical paintings, and elements of Hellenistic art.

Larger miniatures of the Gospels of Lesser Armenia related to Early Christian miniature art in 1038 (Matenadaran after Mesrop Mashtots, Yerevan, manuscript N 6201), preserving old stylistic and pictorial rules, contain novelties that formed the basis of all subsequent Armenian iconography, for example, the depiction of the naked Christ on the cross. The graphic development of the style of the group of manuscripts is obvious in Vaspurakan School of Miniature Painting. A group of manuscripts from the late 11th century, led by the Gospel of Moghni, formed the school of Ani the stylistic forms of which bear similarities with the pre-Gothic miniatures, which show the eastern origins of the latter. The miniatures of that group stand out in the monumental-fresco style. In the manuscripts of the 12th century, the traditions of miniature art of the 10th-11th centuries were developed, endowed with tragic-emotional accents, and a great importance was paid to plant-animal motifs. In the first half of the 13th century, before the Mongol invasions, miniature painting flourished in Greater Armenia ("Gospel of Haghpat", "Gospel of Translators"). Miniature painting received an unprecedented new quality in Cilician Armenia. Exquisite manuscripts were collected both in the monasteries and in the royal court, and in addition to the clergy, manuscripts were ordered by members of the royal court and the councilors.

The ritual-church significance of the manuscripts diminished, they were often ordered for personal use, to satisfy the refined taste of the councilors ad their religious feelings. The size of the books decreased, the miniature painters turned more to the depiction of reality and of the neighboring countries (Byzantium և European countries). Famous miniature painters Grigor Mlichetsi, Toros Roslin, Sargis Pitsak and others appeared creating elegant royal manuscripts ("King Hetum II's dinner", "Gospel of Queen Keran"). A relatively stable political situation in some regions of Greater Armenia contributed to the development of miniature painting. While the representatives of the Gladzor School of Miniature Painting stand out with stressed personalities, the artists of Vaspurakan (Simeon Artchishetsi, Zakaria Akhtamartsi, Rstakes, Kirakos Aghbaketsi and others) moved back to more unified painting traditions. The famous center of miniature painting was the Tatev School of Miniature Painting headed by Grigor Tatevatsi, after whom Armenian miniature art was continued in the colonies of the Crimea, New Julfa, Constantinople and elsewhere. In the 17th-18th centuries, Armenian book miniature painting gradually gave way to the printing art of book illustration.

=== Europe ===
==== 8th–12th centuries ====
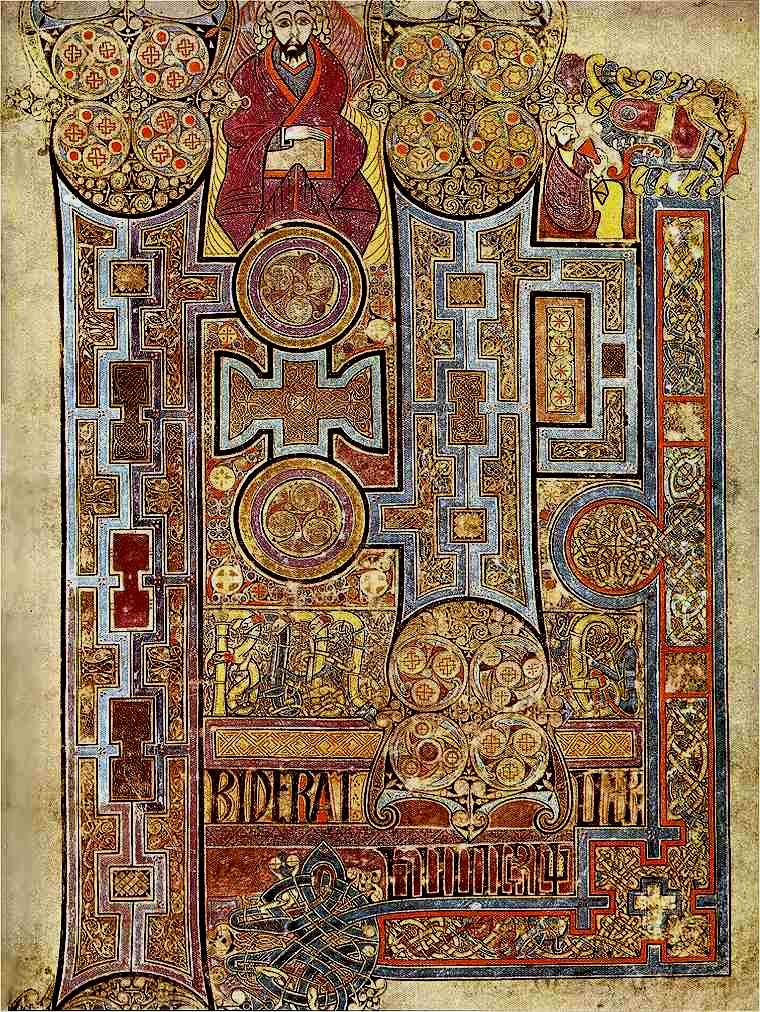
This lavishly decorated text that opens the Gospel of John in the Book of Kells, early 9th century, shows the Insular style of illumination: decorative and not illustrative.

In the native schools of illumination of Western Europe, decoration only was the leading motive. In the manuscripts of the Merovingian period, in the school which connected Frankland and northern Italy, and which is known as Lombardic or Franco-Lombardic, in the manuscripts of Spain, in the productions of the Insular art of the British Isles, figure-drawing was scarcely known, serving rather as a feature of decoration than as a representation of the human form.

The Anglo-Saxon school, developed especially at Canterbury and Winchester, which probably derived its characteristic free-hand drawing from classical Roman models, scarcely influenced by the Byzantine element. The highest qualities of the miniatures of the 10th and 11th century of this school lie in fine outline drawing, which had a lasting influence on the English miniature of the later centuries. But the southern Anglo-Saxon school rather stands apart from the general line of development of the western medieval miniature.

Under the Carolingian monarchs there developed a school of painting derived from classical models, chiefly of the Byzantine type. In this school, which owed its origin to the encouragement of Charlemagne, it is seen that the miniature appears in two forms. First, there is the truly conventional miniature following the Byzantine model, the subjects being generally the portraits of the Four Evangelists, or portraits of the emperors themselves: the figures formal; the pages brilliantly colored and gilded, generally set in architectural surroundings of a fixed type, and devoid of landscape in the real sense of the word. Accompanied as it was with profuse decoration in border and initial, it set the pattern for the later Continental schools of the West. On the other hand, there is also the miniature in which there is an attempt at illustration, as, for example, the depicting of scenes from the Bible. Here there is more freedom; and we trace the classical style which copies Roman, as distinguished from Byzantine, models.

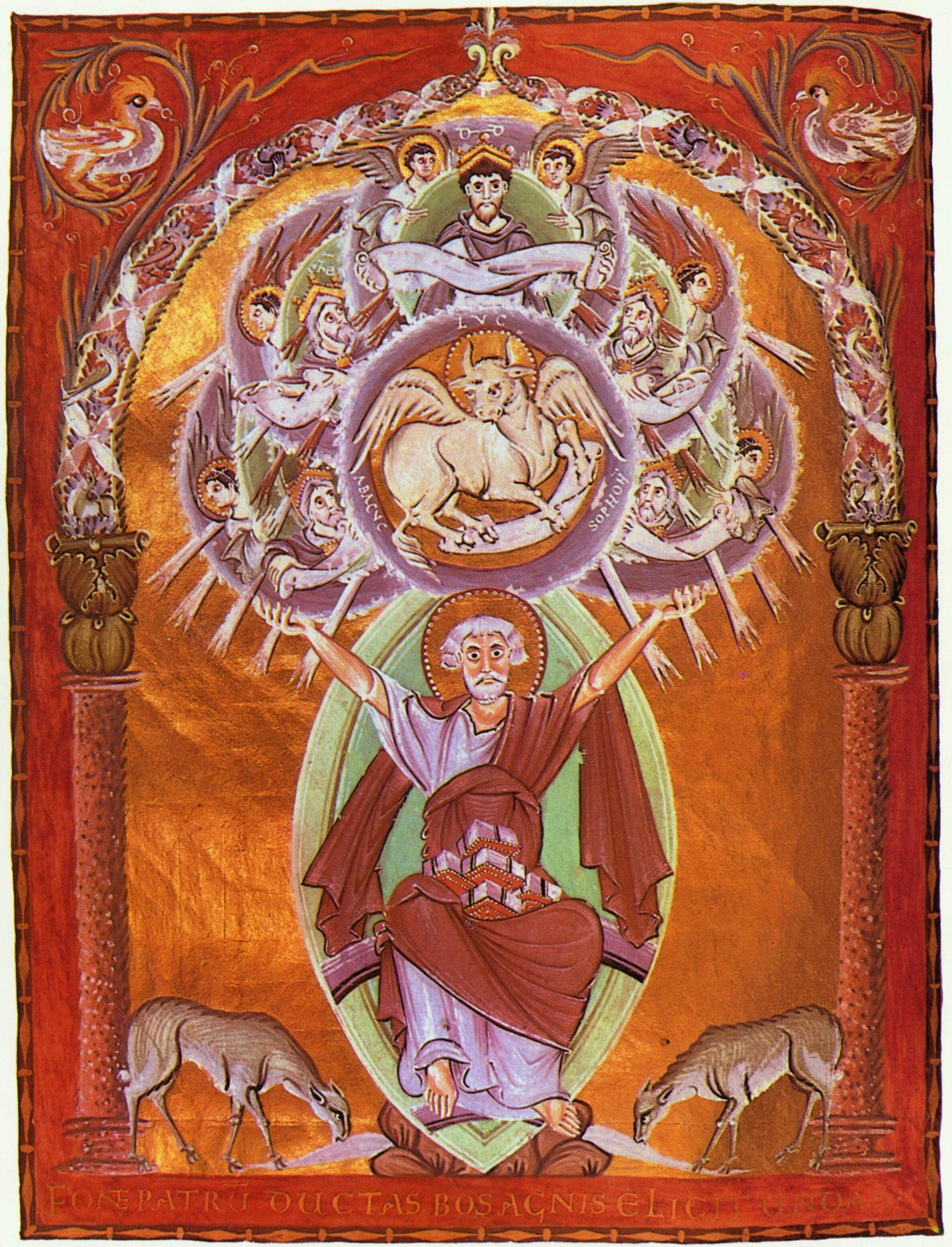
Gospels of Otto III, Reichenau Abbey (around 1000), Luke the Evangelist

Under the subsequent Ottonian monarchs in East Francia, the early Ottonian manuscripts are still clearly in the Carolingian tradition. Like these, they are based on a programmatic reference to the ancient tradition, so that this era is referred to as the Ottonian Renaissance, based on the Carolingian Renaissance. Nevertheless, ancient naturalism and illusionism, which had been adapted in some manuscripts during the Carolingian period, were now completely sacrificed to a stylized formal language. The most important links between Carolingian and Ottonian illumination were the Abbey of St. Gall, the Abbey of Fulda (Codex Wittekindeus) and the Abbey of Corvey. There no longer seems to have been a court school like in Carolingian times. The most important art centers at the time of Otto the Great were Cologne, where a distinctive painterly style with Byzantine influence developed (for example with Hitda Codex), Trier, Regensburg and, above all, Reichenau Abbey (for example with Gero Codex, Petershausen Sacramentary, Codex Egberti or Egbert Psalter). In addition, scriptoria were active in Mainz, Prüm Abbey, the Abbey of Echternach (with the Golden Gospels of Henry III) and elsewhere. In the 11th century, the scriptoria of Tegernsee Abbey, Niederaltaich Abbey, Freising and Salzburg emerged in the Bavarian-Austrian region. From around 990 to 1020, Ottonian illumination reached its peak with the works of the Liuthar group, which were probably created in the Reichenau Island monasteries, including the Liuthar Gospels, the Gospels of Otto III, the Pericopes of Henry II and the Bamberg Apocalypse. Throughout the Ottonian period, the image of the evangelist was a central motif; the image of the ruler, which served to represent the clients' self-portrayal - often in the form of a dedication image - and the Majestas Domini stand out. The dominant stylistic elements are symmetrical, flat representations with a monumental character. Many of the Ottonian illustrations are full-page, sometimes divided into two panels. Large, overly long and expressive figures with ecstatic, suggestive sign language and the courage to use empty, monochrome surfaces - mostly gold backgrounds - characterize the style of these manuscripts, which strongly influenced Expressionism in the 20th century. The illustrations completely lack spatial depth.

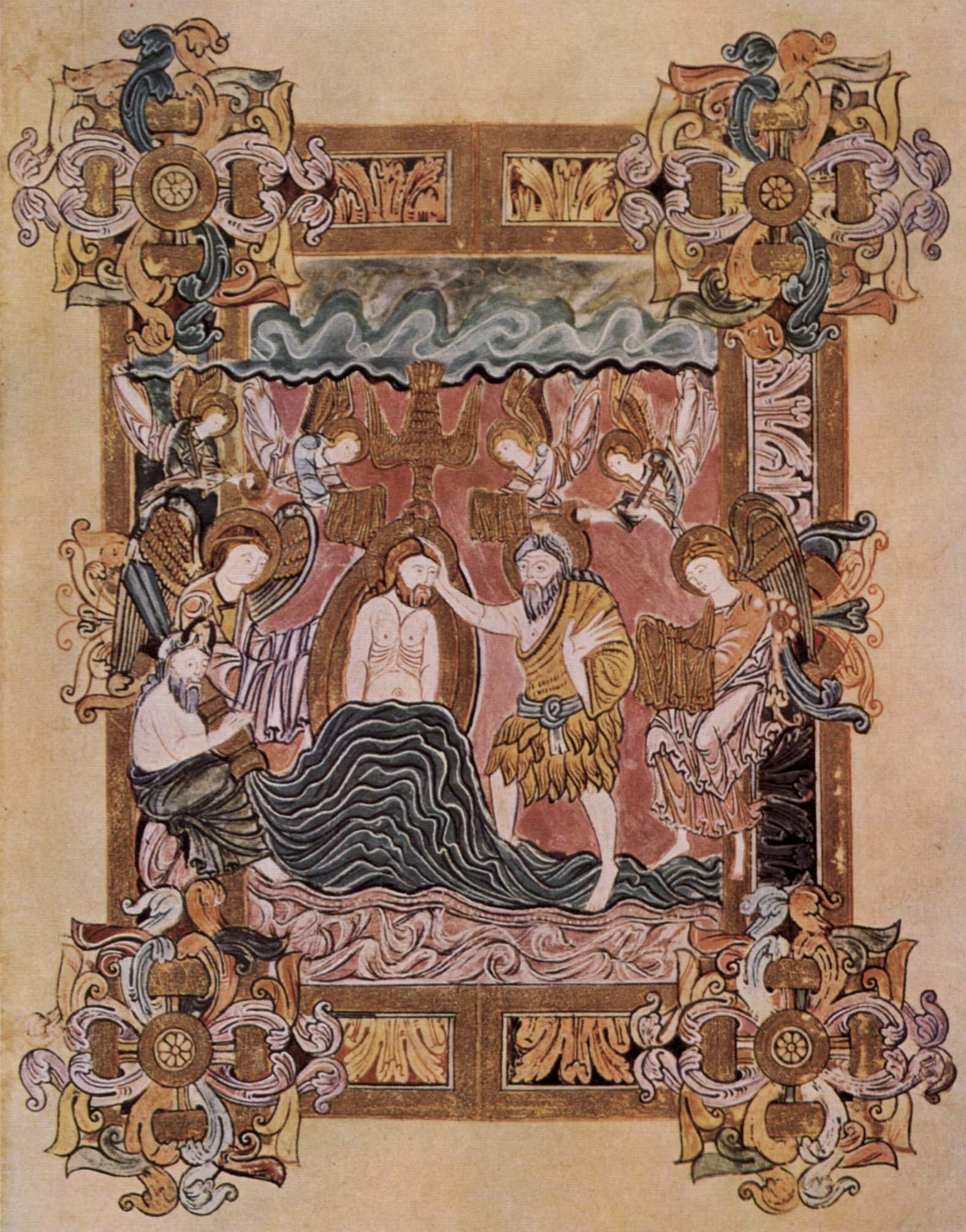
Miniature of the baptism of Christ from the Benedictional of St. Æthelwold, 10th century, is an example of the Anglo-Saxon school.

The influence which the Carolingian school exercised on the miniatures of the southern Anglo-Saxon artists shows itself in the extended use of body-color and in the more elaborate employment of gold in the decoration. Such a manuscript as the Benedictional of St. Æthelwold, bishop of Winchester, 963 to 984, with its series of miniatures drawn in the native style but painted in opaque pigments, exhibits the influence of the foreign art. But the actual drawing remained essentially national, marked by its own treatment of the human figure and by the disposition of the drapery with fluttering folds. The style was refined, tending to exaggeration and disproportion of the limbs. With the Norman Conquest this remarkable native school died.

With the awakening of art in the 12th century the decoration of manuscripts received a powerful impulse. The artists of the time excelled in the border and the initial, but in the miniature also there was vigorous drawing, with bold sweeping lines and careful study of the draperies. The artists grew more practiced in figure-drawing, and while there was still the tendency to repeat the same subjects in the same conventional manner, individual effort produced in this century many miniatures of a very noble character.

The Norman Conquest had brought England directly within the fold of Continental art; and now began that grouping of the French and the English and the Flemish schools, which, fostered by growing intercourse and moved by common impulses, resulted in the magnificent productions of the illuminators of north-western Europe from the latter part of the 12th century onwards.

But of natural landscape there is nothing, unless rocks and trees of a stereotyped character can be so regarded. Hence the background of the miniature of the 12th and immediately succeeding centuries became the field for decoration to throw into stronger relief the figures in the scene. And thus arose the practice of filling in the entire space with a sheet of gold, often burnished: a brilliant method of ornament which we have already seen practiced in the Byzantine school. We have also to notice the conventional treatment of the sacred figures, which continue henceforward, from a sense of veneration, to be clad in the traditional robes of the early centuries, while the other figures of the scene wear the ordinary dress of the period.

==== 13th–15th centuries ====
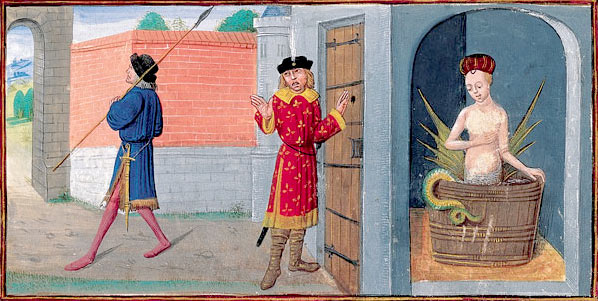
Miniature Roman de Mélusine Guillebert de Mets, 1410.

Entering the 13th century, we reach the period when the miniature may be said to justify the modern false etymology which has connected the title with minuteness. The broad, bold style of the 12th century gives place to the precise and minute. Books in general exchanged their form from the large folio to the octavo and smaller sizes. There was a greater demand for books; and vellum was limited in quantity and had to go further. Handwriting grew smaller and lost the roundness of the 12th century. Contractions and abbreviations in the texts largely increased in number. Everywhere there is an effort to save space. And so with the miniature. Figures were small, with delicate strokes in the features and with neat slim bodies and limbs. The backgrounds blaze with color and burnished gold; and delicate diaper patterns of alternate gold and color abound. Frequently, and especially in English manuscripts, the drawings are merely tinted or washed with transparent colors. In this century, too, the miniature invades the initial. Whereas in the earlier periods bold flowering scrolls are the fashion, now a little scene is introduced into the blank spaces of the letter.

To compare the work of the three schools, the drawing of the English miniature, at its best, is perhaps the most graceful; the French is the neatest and the most accurate; the Flemish, including that of western Germany, is less refined and in harder and stronger lines. As to colors, the English artist affects rather lighter tints than those of the other schools: a partiality is to be observed for light green, for grey-blue, and for lake. The French artist loved deeper shades, especially ultramarine. The Fleming and the German painted, as a rule, in less pure colors and inclined to heaviness. A noticeable feature in French manuscripts is the red or copper-hued gold used in their illuminations, in strong contrast to the paler metal of England and the Low Countries.

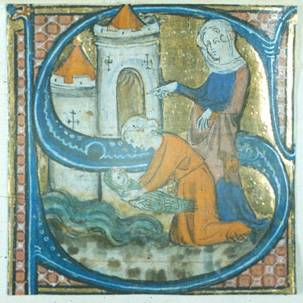
A capital S contains a miniature of Moses being found by the Pharaoh's daughter. From the Breviary of Chertsey Abbey, 14th century.

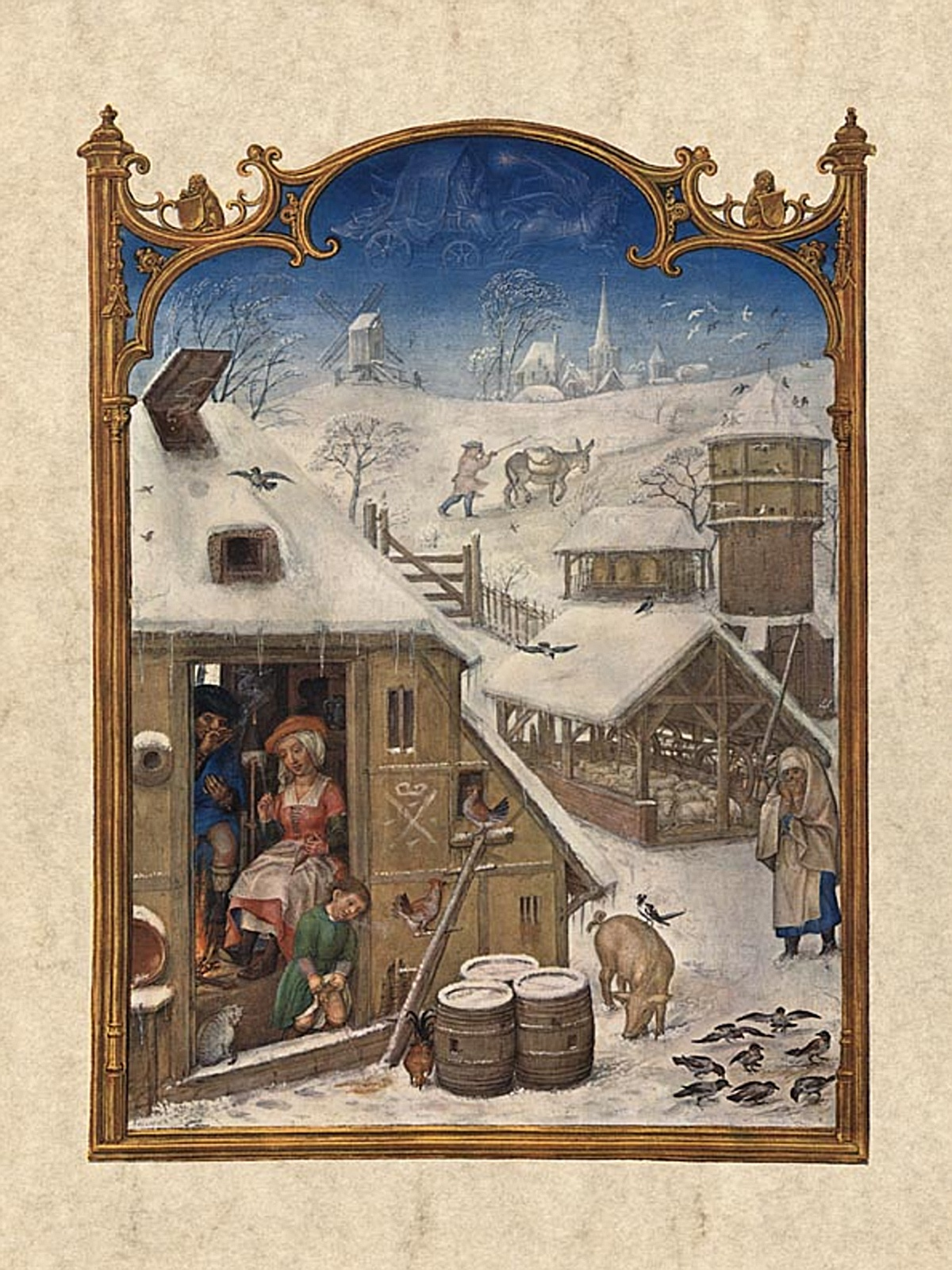
The month February. From the Grimani Breviary, a key work in the late history of Flemish illuminated manuscripts,(c. 1515-1520).

It is remarkable how the art of the miniature throughout the 13th century maintains its high quality both in drawing and color without any very striking change. Throughout the century the Bible and the Psalter were in favor; and naturally the same subjects and the same scenes ran through the period and were repeated by artist after artist; and the very character of those sacred books would tend to restrain innovation. But towards the close of the period such secular works as the romances were growing in popularity, and afforded a wider field for the invention of the illustrating artist. Therefore, with the opening of the 14th century a palpable change of style supervenes. We pass to more flowing lines; not to the bold sweeping strokes and curves of the 12th century, but to a graceful, delicate, yielding style which produced the beautiful swaying figures of the period. In fact the miniature now begins to free itself from the role of an integral member of the decorative scheme of illumination and to develop into the picture, depending on its own artistic merit for the position it is to hold in the future. This is shown by the more prominent place that the miniature now assumes, and by its growing independence of the decorative border and initial.

But, at the same time, while the miniature of the 14th century thus strives to dissociate itself from the rest of the illuminated details of the manuscript, within itself it flourishes in decoration. Besides the greater elasticity of the figuredrawing, there is a parallel development in the designs of the backgrounds. The diapers become more elaborate and more brilliant; the beauty of the burnished gold is enhanced by the stippled patterns which are frequently worked upon it; the gothic canopies and other architectural features which it became the practice to introduce naturally followed the development of the architecture of the period. In a word, the great expansion of artistic sentiment in decoration of the best type, which is so prominent in the higher work of the 14th century, is equally conspicuous in the illuminated miniature.

In the early part of the century, English drawing is very graceful, the figures bending with a waving movement which, if they were not so simple, would be an affectation. Both in the outline specimens, washed with transparent color, and in the fully. painted examples, the best English work of this time is unsurpassed. French art still maintains its neat precision, the colors more vivid than those of England and the faces delicately indicated without much modelling. The productions of the Low Countries, still keeping to the heavier style of drawing, appear coarse beside the works of the other schools. Nor does German miniature art of this period hold a high position, being generally mechanical and of a rustic character. As time advances the French miniature almost monopolizes the field, excelling in brilliancy of coloring, but losing much of its purity of drawing although the general standard still remains high. The English school gradually retrogrades and, owing no doubt to political causes and to the wars with France, appears to have produced no work of much value. It is only towards the end of the 14th century that there is a revival.

This revival has been attributed to a connection with the flourishing school of Prague, a school which in the scheme of coloring suggests a southern influence following on the marriage of Richard II with Anne of Bohemia in 1382. The new style of English miniature painting is distinguished by richness of color, and by the careful modelling of the faces, which compares favorably with the slighter treatment by the contemporary French artists. Similar attention to the features also marks the northern Flemish or Dutch school at this period and in the early 15th century; and it may therefore be regarded as an attribute of Germanic art as distinguished from the French style.

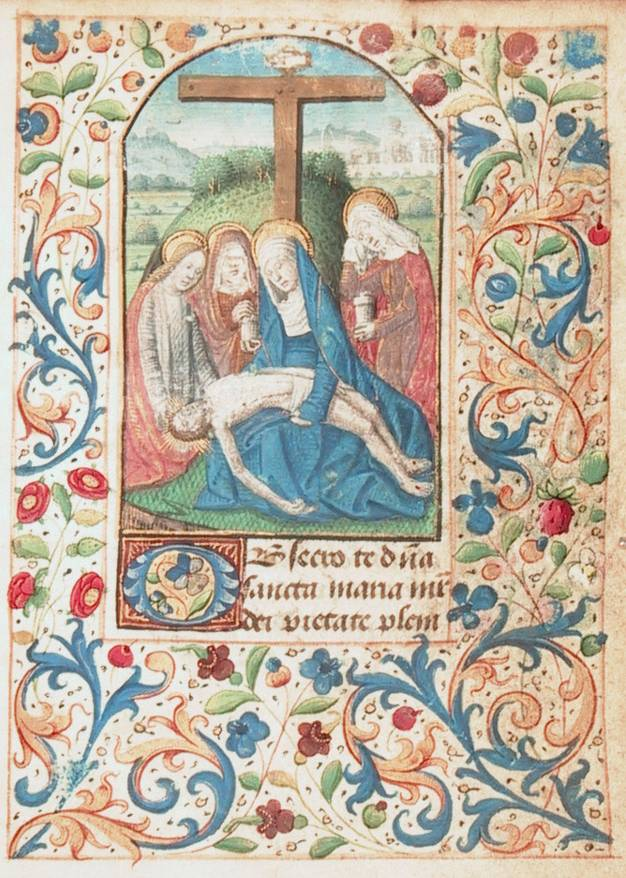
The prayer obsecro te illustrated by a miniature of the pietà, from the Book of Hours of Angers, c. 1470s.

The promise of the new development in English miniature painting, however, was not to be fulfilled. In the first quarter of the 15th century, examples of great merit were produced, but at a standstill in drawing and fettered by medieval convention. The native art practically came to a close about the middle of the century, just when the better appreciation of nature was breaking down the old conventional representation of landscape in European art, and was transforming the miniature into the modern picture. Whatever miniature painting was to be produced in England after that time was to be the work of foreign artists or of artists imitating a foreign style. The condition of the country during the Wars of the Roses sufficiently accounts for the abandonment of art. Thus the history of the miniature in the 15th century must be sought in the manuscripts of the Continental schools.

First we have to consider northern France and the Low Countries. As it passes out of the 14th and enters the 15th century, the miniature of both schools begins to exhibit greater freedom in composition; and there is a further tendency to aim rather at general effect by the coloring than neatness in drawing. This was encouraged by the wider field opened to the miniaturist. Books of all kinds were illustrated, and sacred books, Bibles and Psalters and liturgical books, were no longer the chief, if not the only, manuscripts which were illuminated. And yet there was one class of manuscript which came into the greatest prominence and which was at the same time liturgical. This was the Horae, or Book of Hours, devotional books for individual use, which were multiplied in vast numbers and contained some of the finest work of the miniaturists. The decoration of these little volumes escaped in great measure from the conventional restraints which their religious character might have imposed. Furthermore, the demand for illuminated manuscripts had by this time established a regular trade; and their production was not confined, as formerly, to the cloister. Notable secular illuminated manuscript artists include Master Honoré of the Parisian school.

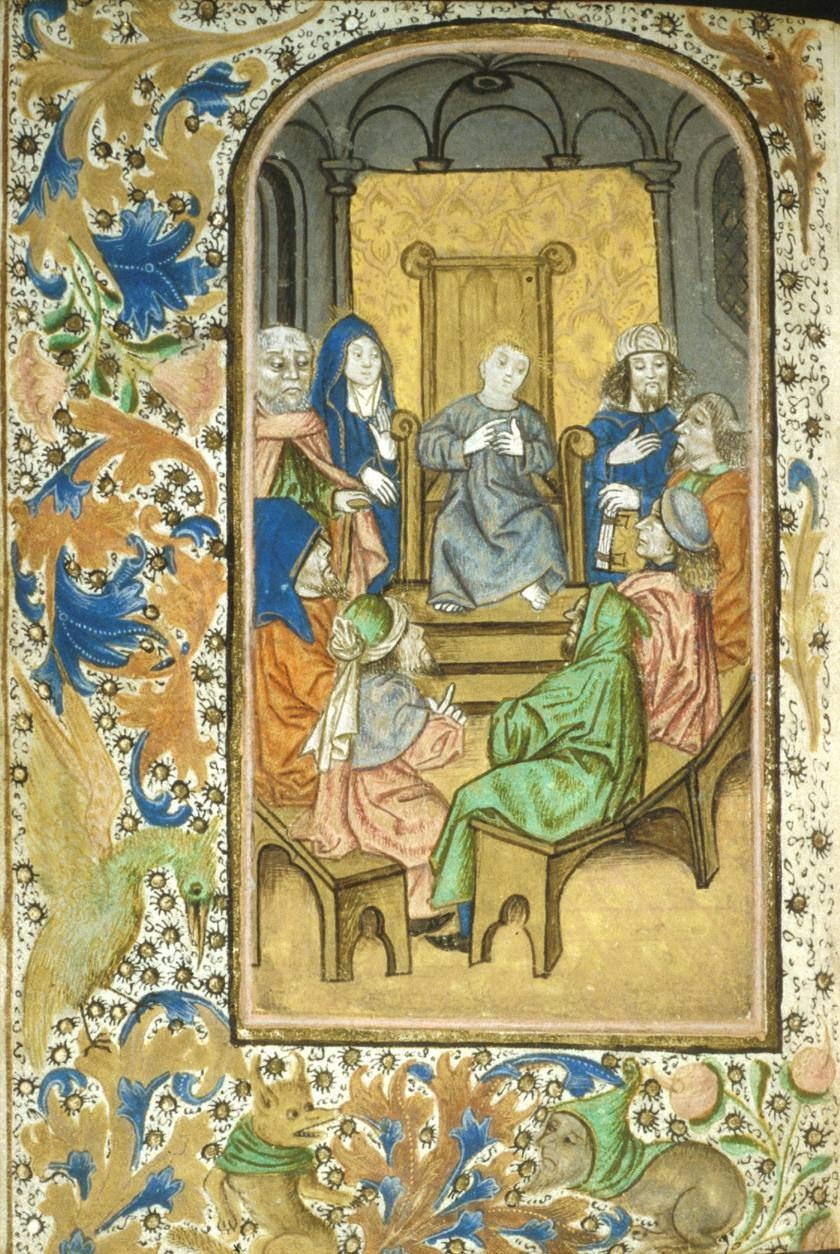
Miniature of Mary and Joseph discovering Jesus among the doctors. From the Enkhuizen Book of Hours, late 15th century.

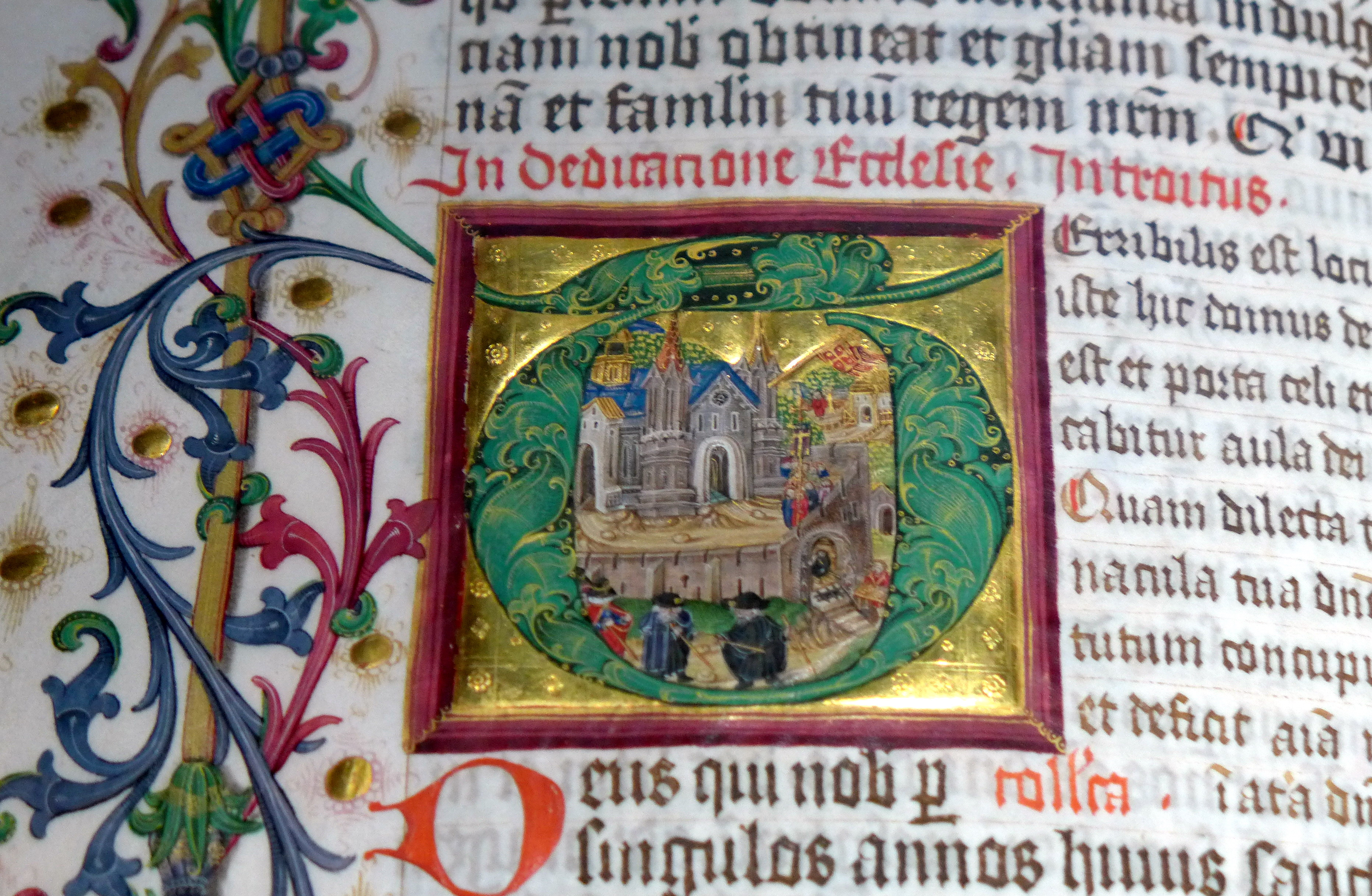
Miniature from the Missale Cisterciense (Wolfgang Missale) in the Rein Abbey Library from Austria, 1493, well after printed books were available.

Early in the century the old conventional treatment of landscape still held its own; nor did the diapered and gilded background pass out of use. Indeed, in some of the finest French specimens of the time the diapered patterns are more brilliant than ever. But natural scenery in the second quarter of the century asserts itself more decidedly, although with faults in perspective. It was not until another generation had arisen that there was a true appreciation of the horizon and of atmospheric effect.

The miniatures of the French and Flemish schools run fairly parallel for a time, but after the middle of the century national characteristics become more marked and divergent. The French miniature began to deteriorate, though some very fine examples were produced by the more gifted artists of the school. The figure-drawing was more careless, and the painting tended to hardness without depth, which the artist endeavoured to relieve by an excess of gilt shading.

The Flemish school in the latter part of the 15th century attained to its highest excellence. The Flemish miniature affected extreme softness and depth of color; also an ever-increasing carefulness in the treatment of details, of the draperies, of the expression of the features: the Flemish type of the Virgin's face, for example, with its full, high forehead, can never be mistaken. In the best Flemish miniatures of the period the artist succeeds in presenting a wonderful softness and glow of color; nor did the high standard cease with the 15th century, for many excellent specimens still remain to attest the favor in which it was held for a few decades longer.

In the foregoing remarks what has been said in regard to the careful treatment of details applies still more to the miniatures executed in grisaille, in which the absence of color invited an even stronger accentuation of that treatment. This is perhaps most observable in the grisaille miniatures of northern Flanders, which often suggest, particularly in the strong angular lines of the draperies, a connection with the art of the wood engraver.

== Other traditions ==
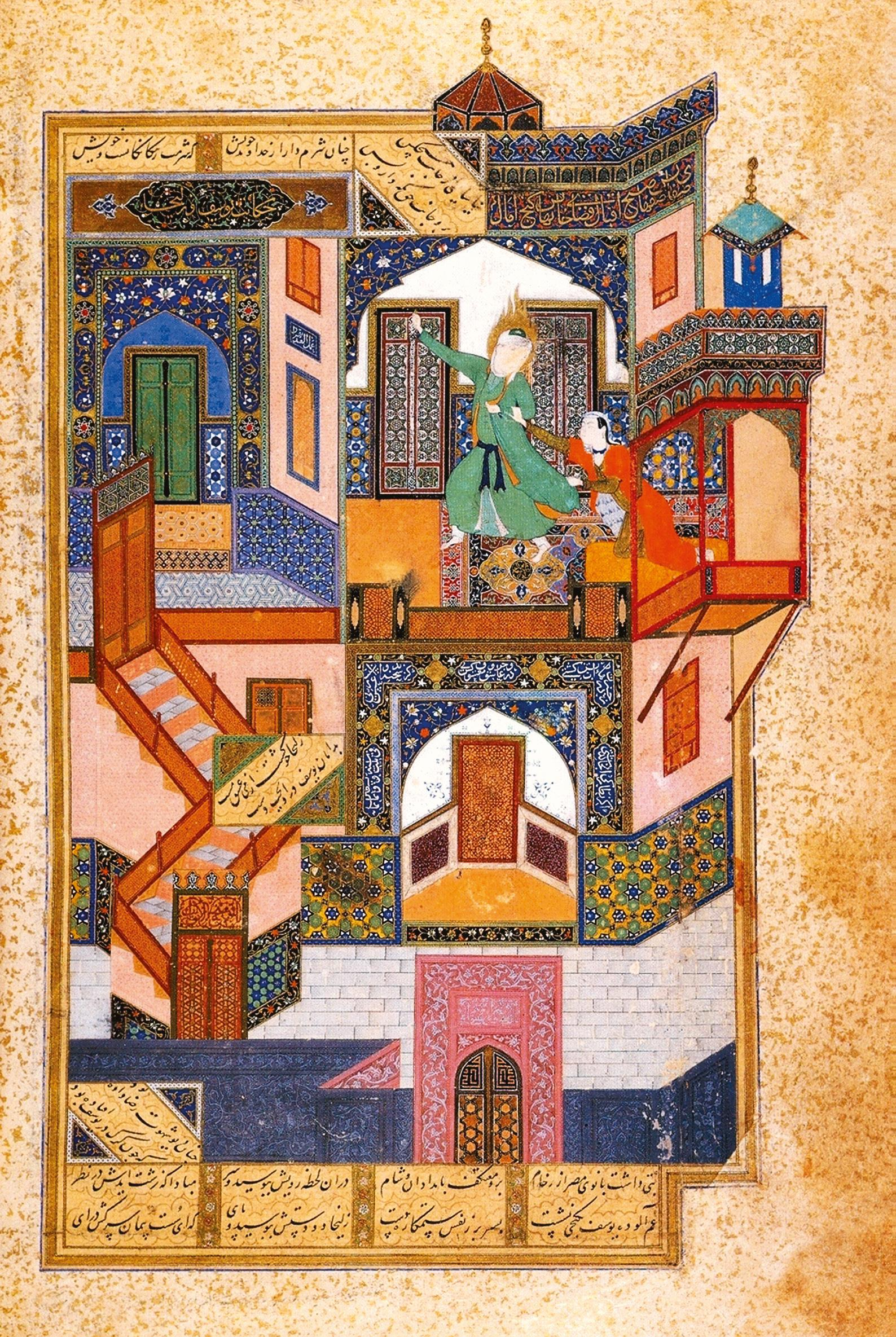
Yusuf and Zulaikha (Yusuf pursued by Potiphar's wife), miniature signed by Behzād, 1488.

Despite Islam's objections to figurative art, Persia and the Persianate world continued what seems to have been a pre-existing tradition of book illustration, while the figurative Arabic miniature was relatively uncommon, other than figures in practical images such as diagrams. However, in Islamic art luxury manuscripts, including those of the Quran (which was never illustrated with figurative images) were often decorated with highly elaborate designs of geometric patterns, arabesques and other elements, sometimes as border to text. This is known as "illumination".

=== Arabic tradition ===
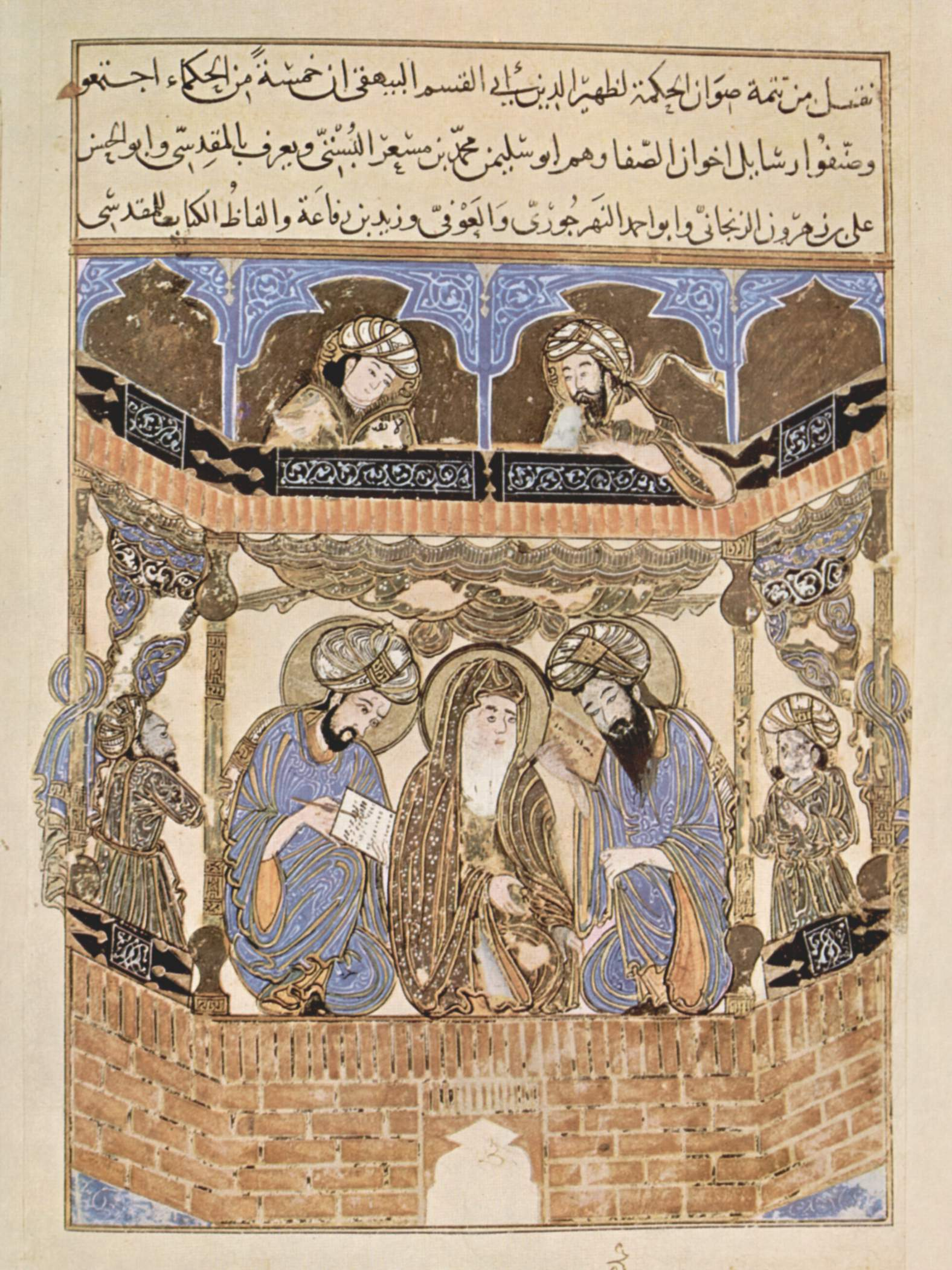
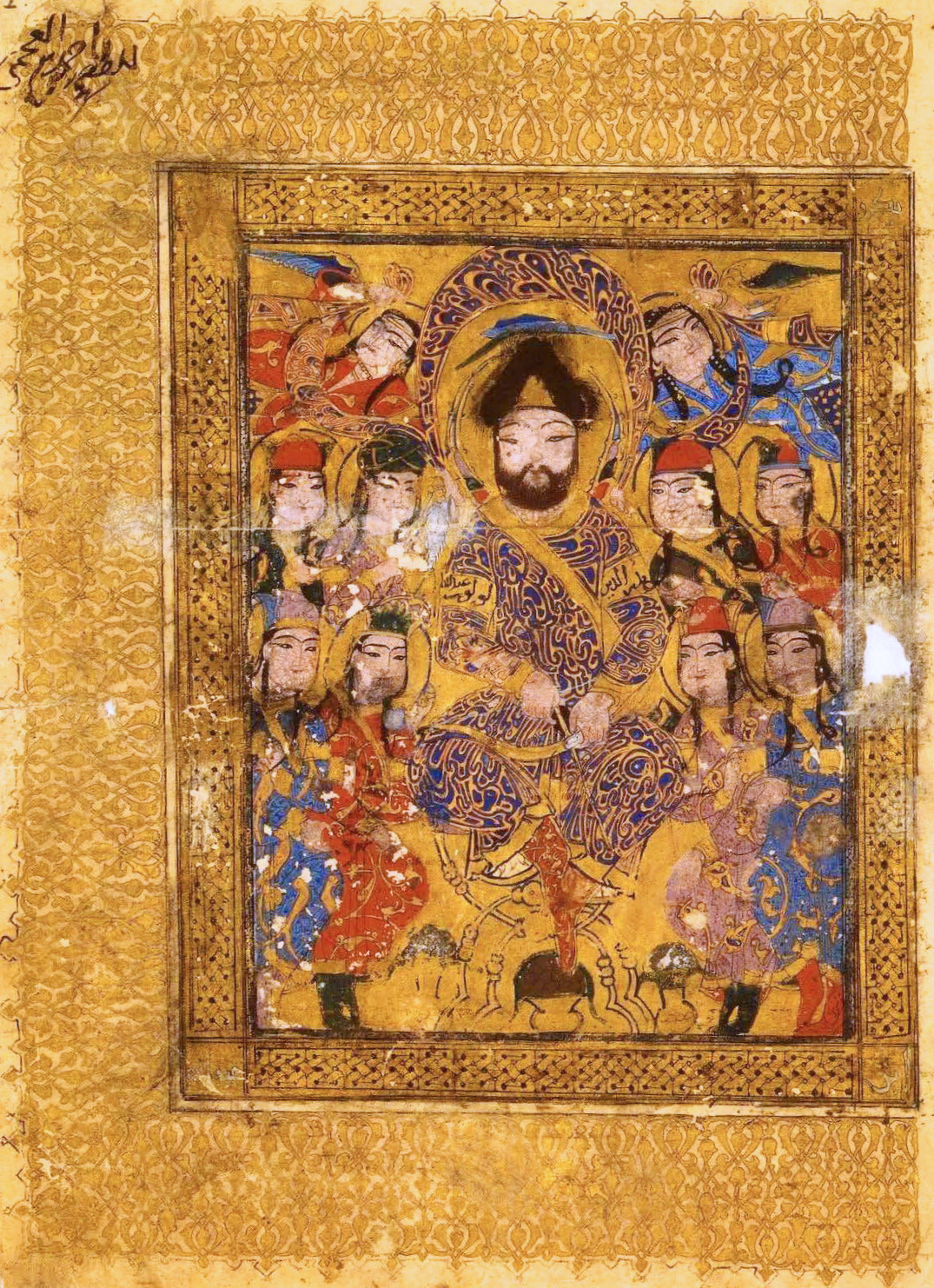
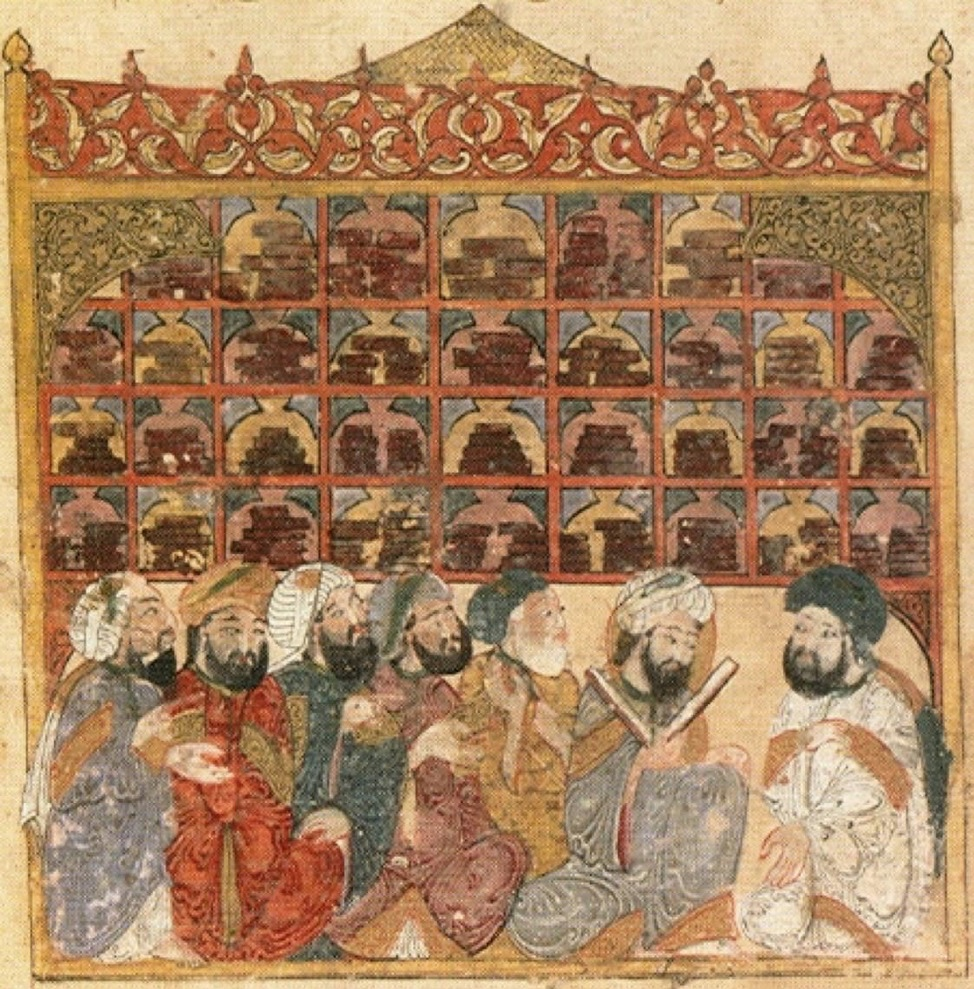
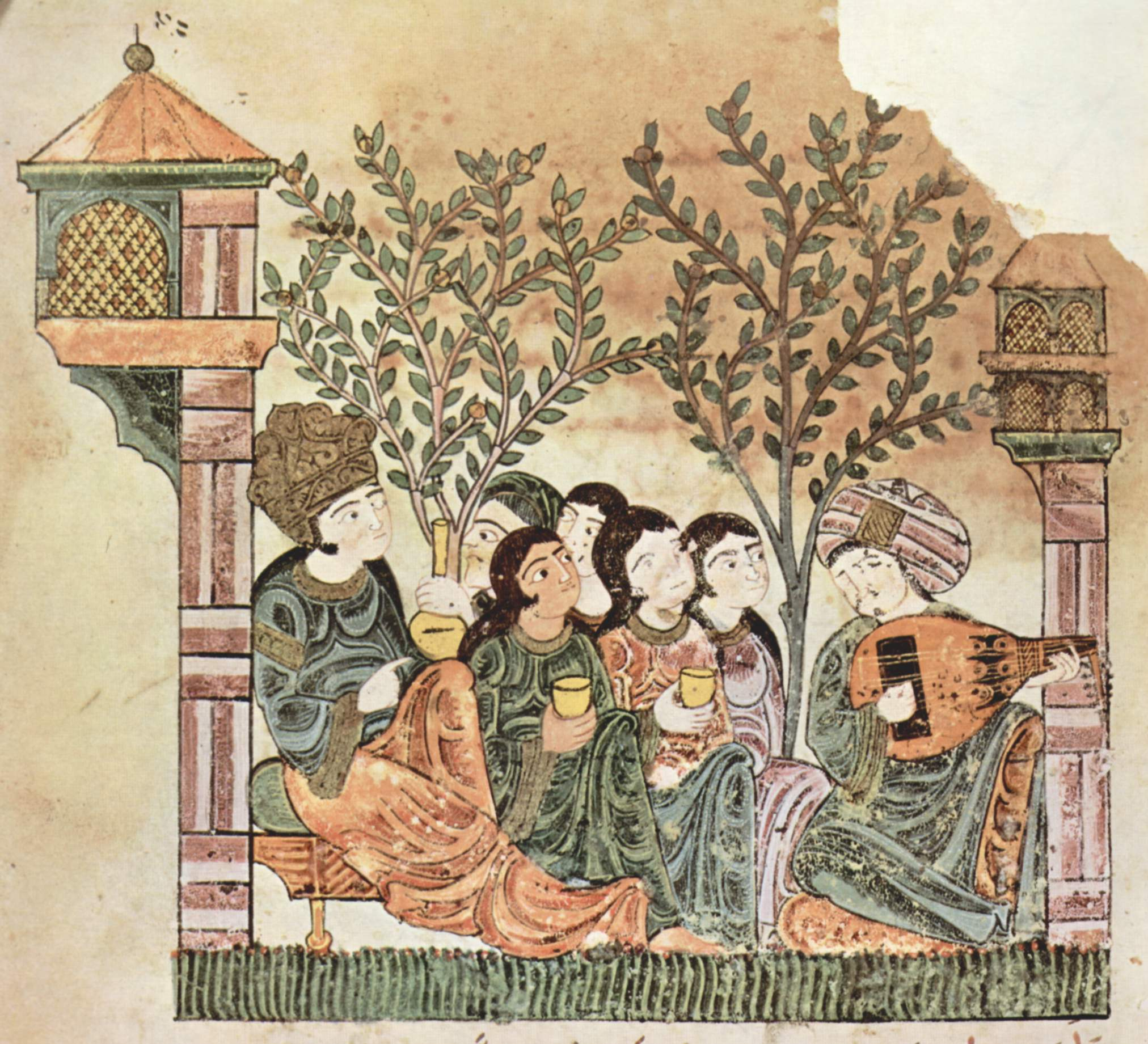
Various examples of pages from Arabic illuminated manuscripts.

Arabic miniatures (Arabic: الْمُنَمْنَمَات الْعَرَبِيَّة, Al-Munamnamāt al-ʿArabīyah) are small paintings on paper, usually book or manuscript illustrations but also sometimes separate artworks that occupy entire pages. The earliest example dates from around 690 AD, with a flourishing of the art from between 1000 and 1200 AD in the Abbasid caliphate. The origins of Arabic miniature painting have been traced by some scholars to pre-Islamic traditions, particularly Sasanian painting and Manichaean book art. Art historian Thomas W. Arnold argued for the survival of Sasanian and Manichaean aesthetic elements in Islamic manuscript painting. Zsuzsanna Gulácsi's study of Manichaean illuminated manuscripts documents technical and stylistic features—such as brushwork iconography, and use of color—that have been suggested to influence later Islamic and Persian miniature painting. Some researchers (e.g., S. Latifpour) have further argued that certain ornamental and illumination features of early Qur'an manuscripts show affinities with Manichaean book art, although further comparative study and wider scholarly consensus are needed for definitive conclusions. The art form went through several stages of evolution while witnessing the fall and rise of several Islamic caliphates. Arab miniaturists absorbed Chinese and Persian influences brought by the Mongol destructions, and at last, got totally assimilated and subsequently disappeared due to the Ottoman occupation of the Arab world. Nearly all forms of Islamic miniatures (Persian miniatures, Ottoman miniatures and Mughal miniatures) owe their existences to Arabic miniatures, as Arab patrons were the first to demand the production of illuminated manuscripts in the Caliphate, it wasn't until the 14th century that the artistic skill reached the non-Arab regions of the Caliphate.

Despite the considerable changes in Arabic miniature style and technique, even during their last decades, the early Umayyad Arab influence could still be noticed. Arabic miniature artists include Ismail al-Jazari, who illustrated his own Book of Knowledge of Ingenious Mechanical Devices, and the Abbasid artist, Yahya Al-Wasiti, who probably lived in Baghdad in the late Abbasid era (12th to 13th-centuries), was one of the pre-eminent exponents of the Baghdad school. In 1236-1237, he is known to have transcribed and illustrated the book, Maqamat (also known as the Assemblies or the Sessions), a series of anecdotes of social satire written by Al-Hariri of Basra. The narrative concerns the travels of a middle-aged man as he uses his charm and eloquence to swindle his way across the Arabic world.

With most surviving Arabic manuscripts in western museums, Arabic miniatures occupy very little space in modern Arab culture.

=== Persian ===
Persian art has a long tradition of the use of miniatures, both for illustrated books and individual pieces, which were collected in albums (muraqqa). The Mughal miniature tradition was heavily influenced by Persia, and began when a group of artists was recruited for India, miniatures having fallen into disfavour in the Persian court of Tahmasp I. Reza Abbasi (1565–1635), considered one of the most renowned Persian painters of all time, specialized in the Persian miniature, with a preference for naturalistic subjects. Today his surviving works can be found in many of the major museums of the Western world, such as the Smithsonian, the Louvre and the Metropolitan Museum of Art.

In 2020, UNESCO declared the miniature art of Azerbaijan, Iran, Turkey and Uzbekistan as one of the masterpieces of the intangible cultural heritage of humanity.

=== India ===
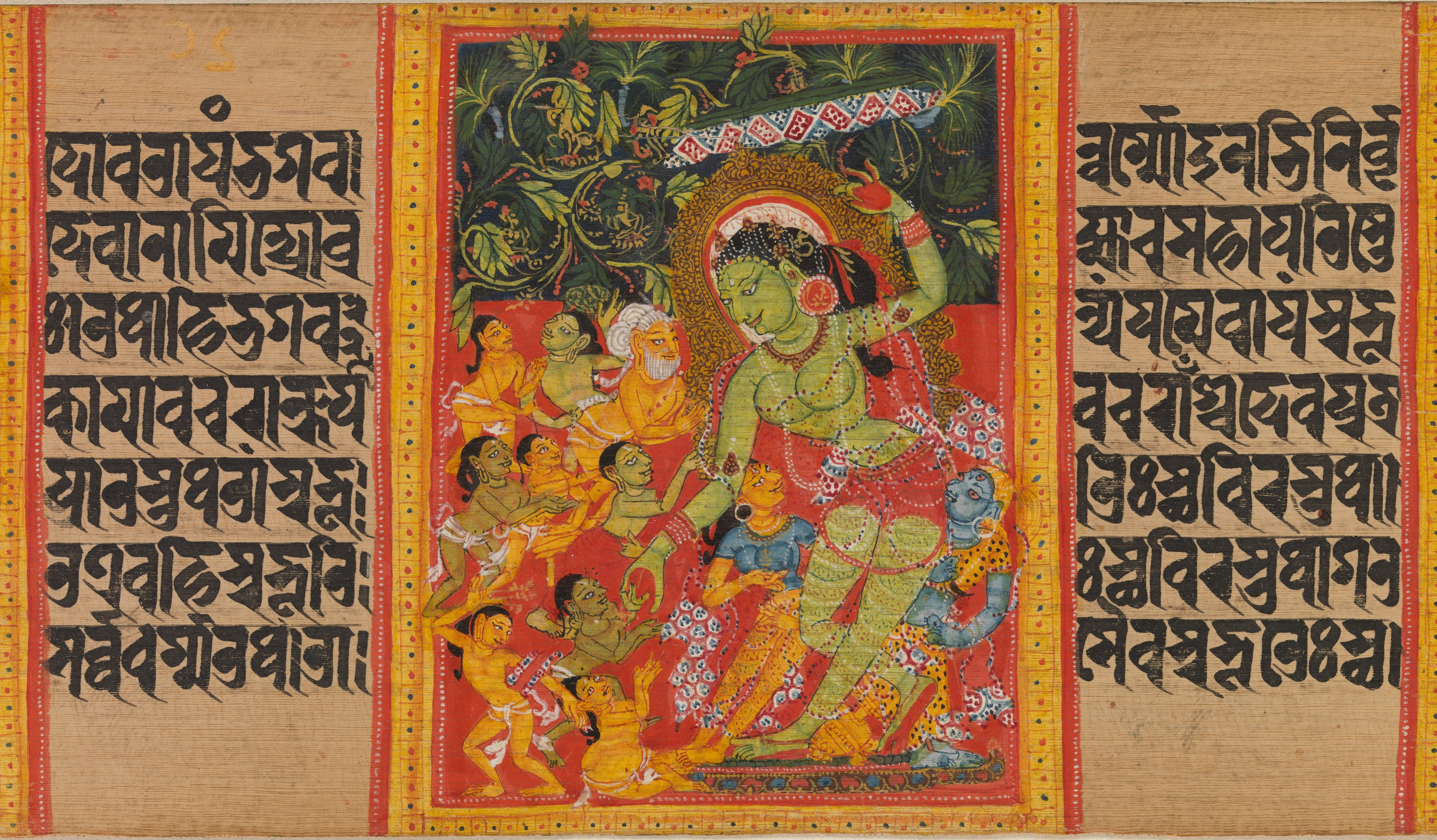
Bengal Folio Painting, early 12th century.

Under the patronage of Pala Dynasty miniature painting was introduced in India by painting on Buddhist palm leaf manuscripts. One of the earliest surviving examples of Buddhist illustrated palm leaf manuscripts is Aṣṭasāhasrikā Prajñāpāramitā dated to 985 AD preserved in the University of Cambridge library. The art of Pala illuminated manuscripts developed in Buddhist centers of Bihar and Bengal. The Pala miniature paintings not only inspired Nepalese and Tibetan miniature paintings but also inspired Hinduism and Jainism to develop their own miniature painting traditions in later periods.

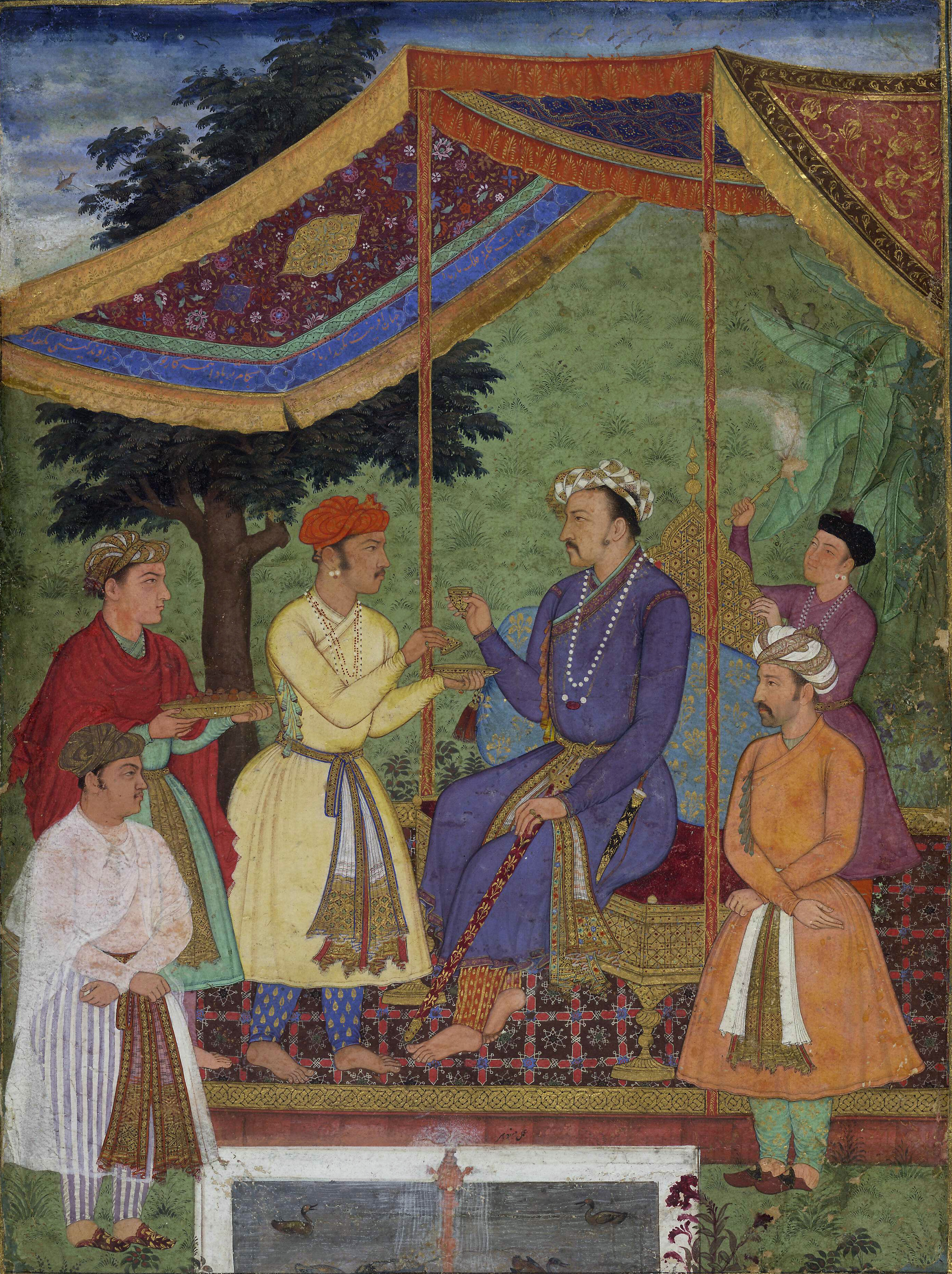
The Emperor Jahangir receiving his two sons, an album-painting of c 1605-06

Mughal painting developed during the period of the Mughal Empire (16th - 18th centuries) and was generally confined to miniatures either as book illustrations or as single works to be kept in albums. It emerged from the Persian miniature painting tradition introduced to India by Mir Sayyid Ali and Abd al-Samad in the mid 16th century. It soon moved away from its Safavid origins; with the influence of Hindu artists, colors became brighter and compositions more naturalistic. The subject matter was predominantly secular, mainly consisting of illustrations to works of literature or history, portraits of court members and studies of nature. At its height the Mughal painting style represented an elegant marriage of Persian, European, and Hindi art.

In the Muslim Deccan sultanates miniature painting styles emerged with influence direct from Persia, and with some from existing Hindu painting. The Deccan painting style was freer and more extravagant than Mughal painting, if not as consistent in quality or naturalism. As the Mughals conquered the sultanates over the 17th century, the artists dispersed. A version of the Mughal style spread to princely courts, mostly Hindu, in North India, especially in Rajput painting, where several different styles developed. Pahari painting covers a number of small courts in the foothills of the Himalayas, and the Bikaner style came from further south. By the 18th century the Rajput courts were producing the most innovative Indian painting.

=== Ottoman Empire ===
The tradition of the Ottoman Empire began under Persian influence, and Persian miniatures were keenly collected by the Sultans. A distinctive Ottoman style soon developed, with a greater interest in narrative, and recording the history of the empire. Ottoman illumination was also extensively used on court manuscripts.

== Forgeries ==
Miniatures are forged for various reasons. Forged Islamic miniatures depicting scientific advancements are made by Turkish artisans as souvenirs, and can often be found innocuously as stock photos on the Internet or within formal learning materials. Medieval European miniatures also have been forged to deceive collectors by various persons, one of the most notable forgers being the Spanish Forger.

== See also ==
- Commentary on the Apocalypse by Beatus
- Book of Job in Byzantine illuminated manuscripts
