= Pericope =

Set of verses that forms one coherent unit or thought; usually of sacred scripture

In rhetoric, a pericope (/pəˈrɪkəpiː/; Greek περικοπή, "a cutting-out") is a set of verses that forms one coherent unit or thought, suitable for public reading from a text, now usually of sacred scripture.

== Description ==
The term can also be used as a way to identify certain themes in a chapter of sacred text. Its importance is mainly felt in, but not limited to, narrative portions of sacred scripture (as well as poetic sections).

Manuscripts—often illuminated—called pericopes, are normally evangeliaries, that is, abbreviated Gospel Books only containing the sections of the Gospels required for the Masses of the liturgical year. Notable examples, both Ottonian, are the Pericopes of Henry II and the Salzburg Pericopes.

Lectionaries are normally made up of pericopes containing the Epistle and Gospel readings for the liturgical year. A pericope consisting of passages from different parts of a single book, or from different books of the Bible, and linked together into a single reading is called a concatenation or composite reading.

== See also ==
- Jesus and the woman taken in adultery, known as the "Pericope Adulteræ"
- Parashah, section of the Hebrew Bible
- Weekly Torah portion
- Sugya, a pericope of the Talmud
