= Pericopes of Henry II =

1012 AD Ottonian illuminated manuscript

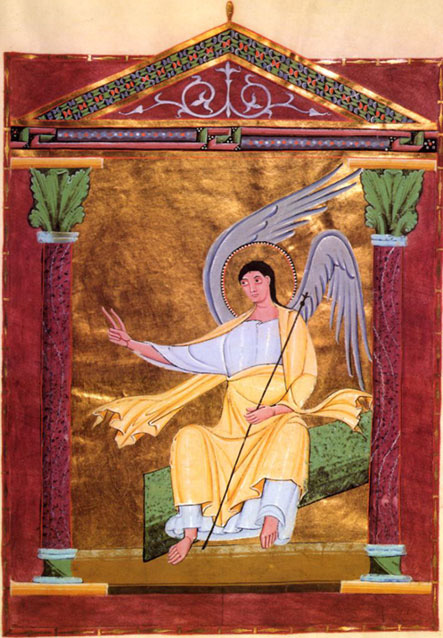
Folio 117r of the Pericopes of Henry II, Reichenau, c. 1002–1012: the Angel on the Tomb. The facing folio, 116v, contains an illumination of the three Maries approaching the empty tomb.

The Pericopes of Henry II (German: Perikopenbuch Heinrichs II.; Munich, Bavarian State Library, Clm 4452) is a luxurious medieval illuminated manuscript made for Henry II, the last Ottonian Holy Roman Emperor, made c. 1002–1012 AD. The manuscript, which is lavishly illuminated, is a product of the Liuthar circle of illuminators, who were working in the Benedictine Abbey of Reichenau, which housed a scriptorium and artists' workshop that has a claim to having been the largest and artistically most influential in Europe during the late 10th and early 11th centuries. An unrivalled series of liturgical manuscripts was produced at Reichenau under the highest patronage of Ottonian society. (Other centers include scriptoria at Lorsch, Trier, and Regensburg.)

Unlike a gospel book, gospel pericopes contain only the passages from the gospels which are to be read during the liturgical year, making it easier for the priest celebrating Mass to find the gospel reading. It is 425 mm by 320 mm and has 206 vellum folios.

== Style of the miniatures ==
The style of the "Liuthar group", unlike other schools in Ottonian art, departs further from rather than returning to classical traditions; it "carried transcendentalism to an extreme", with "marked schematization of the forms and colours", "flattened form, conceptualized draperies and expansive gesture". Backgrounds are often composed of bands of colour with a symbolic rather than naturalistic rationale, the size of figures reflects their importance, and in them "emphasis is not so much on movement as in gesture and glance", with narrative scenes "presented as a quasi-liturgical act, dialogues of divinity". The group was produced perhaps from the 990s to 1015 or later, and major manuscripts include the Munich Gospels of Otto III, the Bamberg Apocalypse, and a volume of biblical commentary there, and the Pericopes of Henry II, the best known and most extreme of the group, where "the figure-style has become more monumental, more rarified and sublime, at the same time thin in density, insubstantial, mere silhouettes of colour against a shimmering void". The group introduced the background of solid gold to Western illumination.

== Cover ==
A number of ivory plaques depicting the Crucifixion were created during the Carolingian period. One such ivory plaque was set in a border for the book cover of the “Pericopes of Henry II”. The plaque measures 11 by 5 inches and was made in Germany around the year 870, but was inserted into the cover of “Pericopes of Henry II” in the eleventh century. It serves as an example of how older objects were transformed and incorporated into later Carolingian designs. Ancient Roman personifications set the scene and designate the time despite the Christian content. The plaque is one of several crucifixion-themed works which are often assigned to Charles' Court School in Metz, but there is not an identified artist. Around 1014, a frame was made for the plaque to rest in. It is made out of enamels, gold, pearls, and gems showing the book cover’s high value.

In the upper section, above the arms of the cross, there are traditional personifications of the sun, moon, and God's hand motioning from a cloud bank. Three angels are stationed over the head of Christ. Under the arms of the cross, Ecclesia is seen with her chalice and standard, Longinus and Stephaton on either side of Christ, a group of grieving women, John, and ambiguous figures to the right. A dead snake is wrapped around the base of the cross and below the crucifixion is a representation of the Marys at the tomb. A representation of the dead arising from their graves is visible below, separated by a projection that resembles a shelf. Oceanus and Terra are also shown on the plaque's lower edge on either side of a seated woman. The figures depicted closely resemble those in the Utrecht Psalter with their rippling, shape-defining clothing, protruding heads, and aggressive motions. The Four Evangelists are represented in the corners of the frame and Christ and the Twelve Apostles are seen along the border, with Christ in the center along the top edge. The details shown in the plaque and frame indeed give a sense of Christianity and the Carolingian age, which helped to influence the style and ways of interpreting these stories in other art pieces.

== See also ==
- Salzburg Pericopes
