= Scheemaeckers =

Scheemakers or Scheemackers is a Flemish surname. Notable people with the surname include:

- Henry Scheemakers
- Pierre Scheemackers
- Pieter Scheemaeckers
- Peter Scheemakers
- Thomas Scheemakers
