= HMS Sandwich (1679) =

Ship of the line of the Royal Navy

History

England
- Name: HMS Sandwich
- Ordered: 8 September 1677
- Builder: Isaac Betts, Harwich Dockyard
- Launched: May 1679
- Honours and awards: BARFLEUR 1692
- Fate: Broken up to rebuild in 1709

General characteristics as built (1679)
- Class & type: 1677 Construction Programme 90‑gun second rate ship of the line
- Tons burthen: 1,346 0/94 bm
- Length: 161 ft 6 in (49.2 m) gundeck; 126 ft 10 in (38.7 m) keel for tonnage
- Beam: 44 ft 8 in (13.6 m)
- Draught: 20 ft 0 in (6.1 m), aft
- Depth of hold: 18 ft 3 in (5.6 m)
- Propulsion: Sails
- Sail plan: Full-rigged ship
- Complement: 500–660
- Armament: 90 guns of various weights

Great Britain
- Ordered: 20 July 1709
- Builder: Benjamin Rosewell, Chatham Dockyard
- Cost: £24,607.0.5d (rebuild) + £4,057.10.4d (fitting January–February 1720)
- Launched: 21 April 1715
- Commissioned: 11 January 1719/1720, flagship
- Decommissioned: 8 November 1721
- Refit: 1723, guard ship
- Recommissioned: January 1741
- Refit: Spring 1741, flagship
- Decommissioned: 18 April 1747
- Refit: 1752, cut down and fitted as a lazarette
- Stricken: 22 January 1755
- Fate: Broken up, completed 24 March 1770

General characteristics after rebuild (1715)
- Class & type: 1706 Establishment 90‑gun second rate ship of the line
- Tons burthen: 1,573 7/94 bm
- Length: 162 ft 6 in (49.5 m) gundeck; 132 ft 0 in (40.2 m) keel for tonnage
- Beam: 47 ft 4 in (14.4 m)
- Depth of hold: 18 ft 6 in (5.6 m)
- Propulsion: Sails
- Sail plan: Full-rigged ship
- Complement: 680
- Armament: 90 guns: Gundeck: 26 × 32 lb (15 kg); Middle gundeck: 26 × 18 lb (8.2 kg); Upper gundeck: 26 × 9 lb (4.1 kg); Quarterdeck: 10 × 6 lb (2.7 kg); Forecastle: 2 × 6 lb (2.7 kg)

HMS Sandwich was a 90-gun second rate ship of the line of the Royal Navy, launched in May 1679 at Harwich Dockyard. She was built by shipwright Isaac Betts as part of the 'Thirty Great Ships' programme.

== Career ==
Sandwich took part in the Battle of Beachy Head in 1690 during the Nine Years' War.

At the Battle of Barfleur in 1692, she failed to anchor during the flood tide at evening and was swept through the French fleet, taking several raking shots. Her captain, Antony Hastings, was killed.

She underwent a rebuild at Chatham Dockyard, from where she was relaunched on 21 April 1715 as a 90-gun second-rate built to the 1706 Establishment.

She was commissioned in 1720 under Captain William Faulkner for service in the Baltic as flagship of Admiral Sir John Norris. From March 1720 to November 1721, William Smellie, later a pioneer of obstetrics, served as the ship's surgeon. In 1723, she was fitted as a guard ship and served until 1725 under Captain Salmon Morrice at Blackstakes. Between October 1729 and October 1733, she underwent a great repair at Chatham, costing £27,460.30.

In the spring of 1741, she was fitted as a flagship at Chatham and recommissioned in January under Captain Samuel Mead for the Channel. In June 1741, she was under Captain Charles Brown, and from October under Captain Samuel Atkins, again serving in Norris's fleet. She was commanded in 1742–43 by Captain Sir William Hewitt in home waters.

In 1744, she was commanded by Captain Roger Martin as flagship of Rear-Admiral William Martin in Norris's fleet, including convoy duty to Lisbon between April and May. In April 1745, she was at Portsmouth under Captain Harry Powlett, in July briefly under Captain Philip Saumarez, and from October under Captain John Hume.

== Fate ==
Sandwich underwent a survey in March 1747/1748, and in October 1749 was made a church ship at Chatham in place of Union. By Admiralty Order of January 1752, she was cut down and fitted as a lazarette for Stangate Creek under a contract with Mr Temple, completed later that year. She was conveyed to Stangate Creek in November 1754, and deleted from the Navy List in January 1755.

She was finally broken up at Chatham, the work completed on 24 March 1770.
