= Thomas Bentley (manufacturer) =

English manufacturer of pottery (1731–1780)

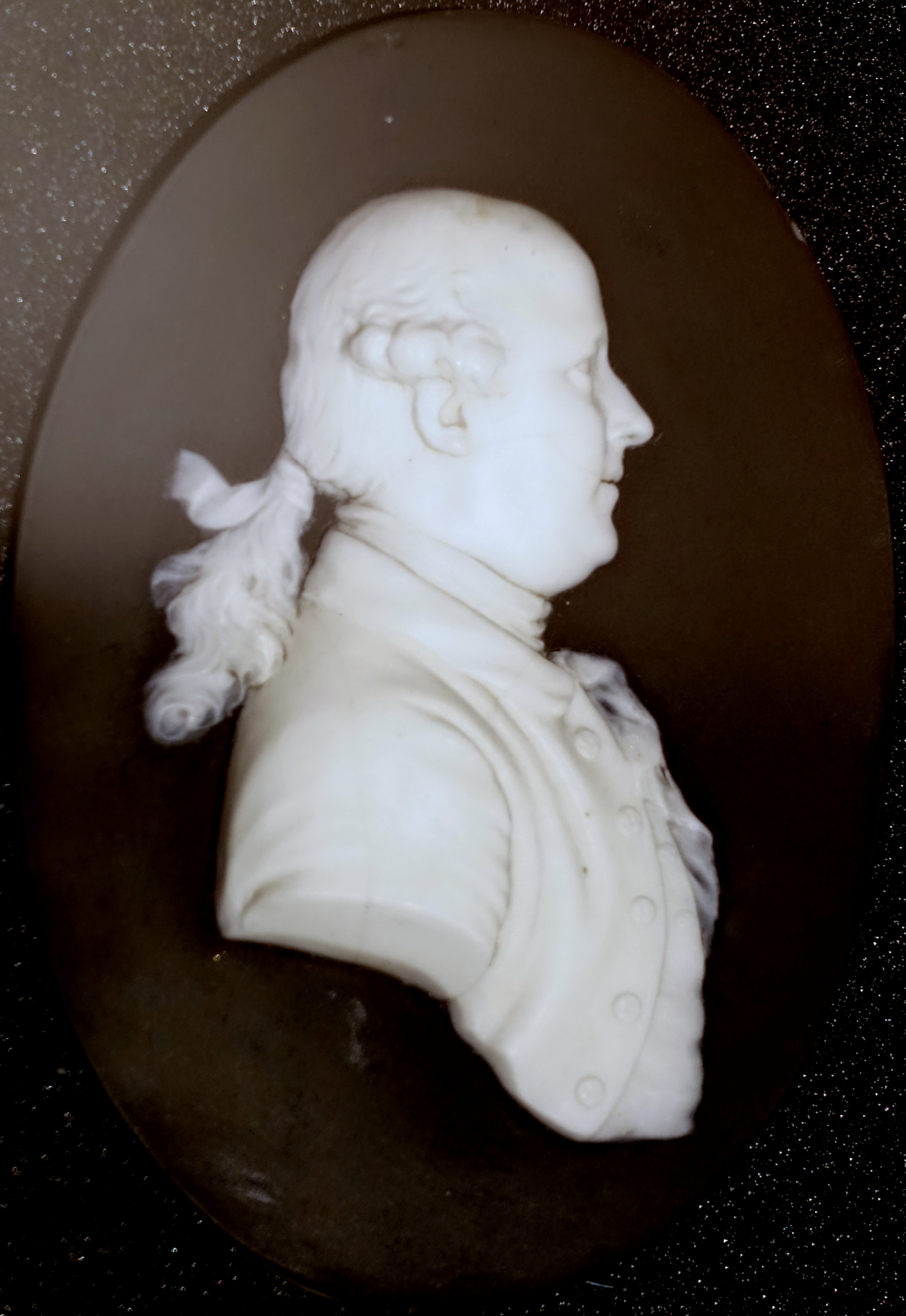
- Thomas Bentley by Joachim Smith, modelled in 1773
- Born: 1 January 1731; Scropton, Derbyshire, England
- Died: 1780 (aged 49)
- Occupation: Manufacturer of pottery

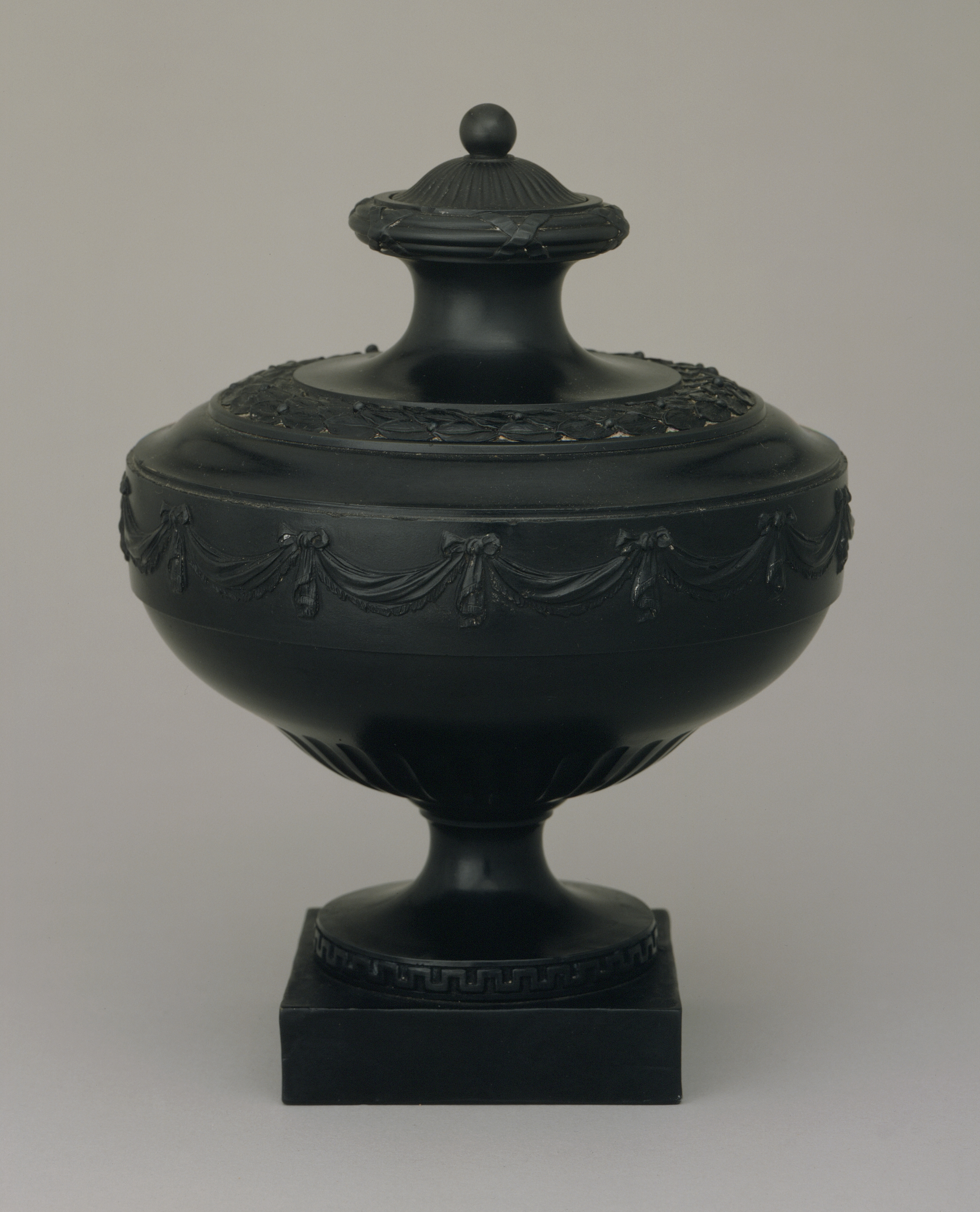
Wedgwood & Bentley black basalt stoneware vase with encaustic ornament, c. 1770–1780, Los Angeles County Museum of Art.

Thomas Bentley (1731–1780) was an English manufacturer of pottery, known for his partnership with Josiah Wedgwood.

== Life ==
He was born at Scropton, Derbyshire, on 1 January 1731. His father, Thomas Bentley, was a country gentleman of some property. After receiving his education at the neighbouring presbyterian academy at Findern, young Bentley, being then about sixteen years of age, was placed in a warehouse at Manchester to learn the processes of the woollen and cotton trades.

On the expiration of his apprenticeship he travelled for some time upon the continent, and after his return he married, in 1754, Miss Hannah Oates of Sheffield. He then settled in Liverpool, where he set up in business as a Manchester warehouseman, and afterwards took James Boardman into partnership. In 1757 he assisted in founding Warrington Academy, and in 1762 in building the Octagon Chapel in Temple Court, Liverpool, for the use of a body of Dissenters, of which he was a prominent member; they preferred a liturgy, but had scruples with regard to the use of the Athanasian Creed and other parts of the Book of Common Prayer. The congregation of this chapel were called Octagonians; but the life of this sect was short, and not long after Bentley's move to London the chapel was closed, and the building sold to the corporation.

In 1762 he was introduced to Josiah Wedgwood by Matthew Turner, when the former was laid up at Liverpool by an accident to his knee. The friendship was lifelong. Wedgwood made his first proposals to Bentley about to a partnership towards the close of 1766, but it was not until 14 November 1768 that the partnership actually began. In the same month Bentley took up his residence at the Brick House, Burslem. This was, however, merely a temporary residence, as he had not then given up his partnership with Boardman in Liverpool.

On 13 June 1769 part of the Etruria Works in Staffordshire was opened; but, though a house was specially built for him there, he never seems to have occupied it. In 1769 he finally left Liverpool, and after living for a short time at the warehouse in Newport Street, London, he moved to Little Cheyne Row, Chelsea, in order to be near the works which the firm had lately established there for overglaze painting.

On 22 June 1772, at All Saints, Derby, Bentley married Mary, the daughter of Mr. Stamford, an engineer of that town, his first wife having died in childbirth within two years from the date of their marriage. In 1774 he moved from Chelsea to 12 Greek Street, Soho, to superintend the works which were being carried on there by the firm. His health, however, failed, and in order to get change of air and scene he took up residence at Turnham Green in 1777. After a protracted illness he died there, 26 November 1780, at the age of forty-nine, and was buried in Chiswick church (in west London), where a monument, with a medallion portrait by Thomas Scheemakers (in his role of running his deceased father, Peter Scheemakers' company), was raised to his memory by his friend Wedgwood.

The partnership between Wedgwood and Bentley was confined to the manufacture and sale of ornamental goods. To wind up the accounts, all the ornamental ware in stock was sold by auction at Christie's: the sale lasted twelve days. Amongst his friends and associates were Benjamin Franklin, Joseph Priestley, and Joseph Banks. He wrote pamphlets, articles, and political songs, and contributed frequently to the Monthly Review. The article on Brindley in the Biographia Britannica was written by him from materials obtained for him by Wedgwood and another friend. His acquaintance with art patrons of the day meant they were able to obtain loans of valuable specimens for the purposes of reproduction.

His Will, proved in the Prerogative Court of Canterbury on 2 January 1781 left £800 to his sister-in-law Elizabeth Oates, £200 to his business partner James Boardman, and to Josiah Wedgwood his share of the "Books of Antiquities and other Prints and printed books" that he owned jointly with Josiah. The remainder of his real and personal estate was left to his "dear and truly affectionate wife Mary" who was his sole Executrix.
