= Henry Scheemakers =

Flemish sculptor

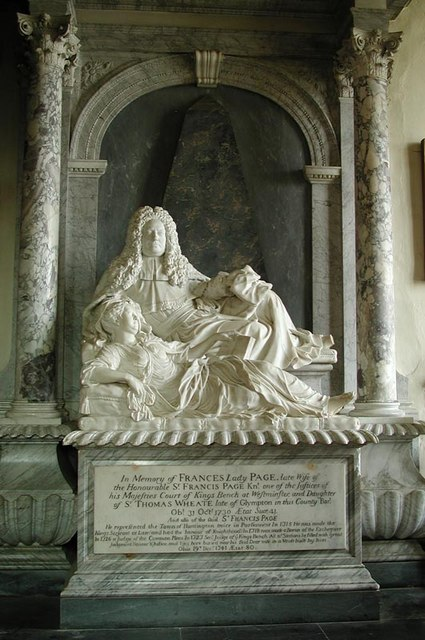
Memorial to Sir Francis Page and his second wife in Steeple Aston church

Henry Scheemakers (birth name: Hendrik Scheemaekers) (Flanders c.1686 - Paris, 18 July 1748) was a Flemish-born sculptor who worked in England and France in the first half of the 18th century.

Henry was elder brother to the better known (in England) Peter Scheemakers the Younger, with whom he collaborated on some projects. Henry's younger son Thomas-Henry took on his uncle Peter the Younger's workshop in Vine Street after Peter retired in the 1770s.

== Life ==
Henry Scheemakers, or Hendrik Scheemaekers in Flemish records, was the eldest son of Antwerp sculptor Pieter Scheemaeckers and his wife Catharina van der Hulst (d.1712).

Birth, Parents and Siblings

His birthdate is unknown but Hendrik Scheemaekers was born around 1686. Hendrik may have been named after the Antwerp sculptor Hendrik Frans Verbrugghen or Verbruggen, who had married Susanna Verhulst in 1682. Henry's younger siblings were Catharina baptised 1 October 1688 (died young), Pieter-Caspar baptised 10 January 1691, Elisabeth baptised 6 July 1693 (still living in 1771), Jan-Frans baptised 2 February 1696 (ditto), and another Catharina baptised 20 March 1698 (died before 1771 leaving one daughter), all at the St Jacobskerk in Antwerp. His parents' marriage had ended in an acrimonious divorce in 1707. Testimony by multiple witnesses during the divorce procedure of 2 July 1708 attested to the awful behaviour of the father Pieter, who mistreated and beat his wife and children calling them 'pigs' and flew into drunken rages during which he destroyed their home.

Hendrik's younger brother Pieter-Caspar known as Peter Scheemakers the Younger (1691-1781) also became a sculptor, as did both of Hendrik's sons : Pierre Scheemackers in Paris, and Thomas-Henry known as Thomas Scheemakers in London.

Henry Scheemakers initially learned his art from his father, but is said by French sources to have gone to Copenhagen as a journeyman to his near-contemporary Johann Adam Sturmberg, where his younger brother Peter Scheemakers the younger later joined him c.1718-1720.

The London Years

Brother Peter Scheemakers had arrived in England by around 1720, going into loose partnership with Gent-born sculptor Laurent Delvaux, especially following the early death of Antwerp-born Pierre-Denis Plumier around mid-1721. The year of Henry's arrival in London is less clear. He was established as a sculptor by 1726, when "Hen. Scheemakers, Statuary" of St Margaret's Westminster took on apprentice John van Nost the younger, nephew (but entered as son) of the Flemish sculptor Jan van Nost, Henry being of the parish of St Margaret's Westminster, and John of St George Hanover Square. In the following year 1727, "Mr Schimacker" first appears in the Westminster Rate Books with address Old Palace Yard in the parish of St Margaret's Westminster.

Around 1729 Henry Scheemakers went into partnership with the English sculptor Sir Henry Cheere, 1st Baronet on a monument to Robert Bertie, 1st Duke of Ancaster and Kesteven (c. 1728; Edenham, Lincolnshire), in which the life-size figure of the Duke clad in Roman armour is flanked by Corinthian columns. He also collaborated with the Flemish sculptor Laurent Delvaux, his brother's business partner, before Delvaux left for Italy in 1728.

Marriage and Children

In the meantime Henry had married Catherine Hennekin at the St James' Royal Catholic Chapel in 1727. Catherine was the daughter of Flemish-born Michiel Hennekin or Michael Hennekin, who had been apprenticed to the great sculptor Jan Claudius de Cock in 1697; Catherine’s brother Simon was a London carver and gilder, as was her nephew George Michael Hennekin. Henry and Catherine Scheemaker's son Michael, named after her father, and daughter Catherine both died young and were buried at St Margaret's Westminster in 1731 and 1734 respectively, but the couple had four surviving children who were named as Henry's heirs in Paris after he died there in July 1748 : Peter, Thomas-Henry, Marie-Louise, Geneviève-Catherine.

Paris

Before moving to Paris, Henry Scheemakers held an auction in July 1733 of some of his stock, but the family was still in London in September 1734 when his daughter Catherine was buried at St Margaret's Westminster.

Despite being resident and working in Paris for almost 15 years, very few of Henry Scheemakers' works in France have been identified with any confidence. The only known items recorded were sculptures of a river and naiads at the Château de Dampierre.

Henry Scheemakers, variously entered in French records as Henri Scheckmackers, Scheekmackers, Shkemacker, and Schektmackers, died on 18 July 1748 on rue Meslé (now Meslay) in Paris, age approximately 65 years old, at 2 am after about two weeks' illness. As Henry's children were underage, their mother Catherine Hennekin was appointed their main guardian.

The inventory taken of his business stock after death includes "60 figures de terre cuite de differentes grandeurs... et differents sujets, une armoire remplie d'outils, deux selles à modeller, un escabel, une table" in a back room on the ground floor, and in the "atelier donnant sur la cour côté rue Meslé... 8 gros vases de pierre de Conflans presque achevés, 4 autre vases non travaillés... modèles en plâtre". The valuation experts were Pierre Danse and Denis Robinot, also sculptors and also resident on rue Meslé. Henry's creditors included Charles Philippe d'Albert de Luynes, Duke and peer of France, who claimed the Enlèvement de Belle Heleinne [sic] par Paris, et Méliagre et Athalas [Atalanta], each 7 foot high. Henry Scheemakers' other creditors included Paul-Ambroise Slodtz (son of sculptor Sébastien Slodtz), sculpteur ordinaire du Roi, living on the rue du Vieux Louvre, who claimed "la moule de torse du Milon de Cretone et le corps en plastre dans ledit moule"; Denis Coulonjon sculpteur à Paris, living at the Cour du Grand Maitre de l'Arsenal, who claimed a terracotta of "Gloire composée de deux tetes de chérubins avec rayons"; Claude-Nicolas Lenoir, marchand de pierre à Conflans-Sainte-Honorine; Pierre Pouillet, tailleur de pierre; Noël Froment, chirurgien du Roi; and the landlord who claimed 200 livres rent for the year.

Sons Pierre and Thomas Scheemakers, sculptors

Henry Scheemakers' elder son Peter (III) Scheemaekers became known in Paris as sculptor Pierre Scheemackers (c.1728-1765). Pierre was admitted to the Academie de St Luc on 15 October 1755, exhibiting several items at the Salons of 1756, 1762 and 1764, and was later appointed Professeur at the Academy in January 1764, but died in Paris on 19 October 1765.

Henry Scheemakers' younger son Thomas-Henry, known as Thomas Scheemakers (c.1740-1808) also became a sculptor, arriving in London by 1763 to work for his uncle (not his father, as hitherto mistakenly believed), sculptor Peter Scheemakers who was childless. Thomas took on his uncle's workshop in Vine Street when Peter retired to his native town of Antwerp where he died ten years later in 1781. Thomas had married in London in 1779 but also died childless, leaving an estate worth almost £3,500 and appointing as executors his wife and Joseph Nollekens the sculptor.

== Works ==
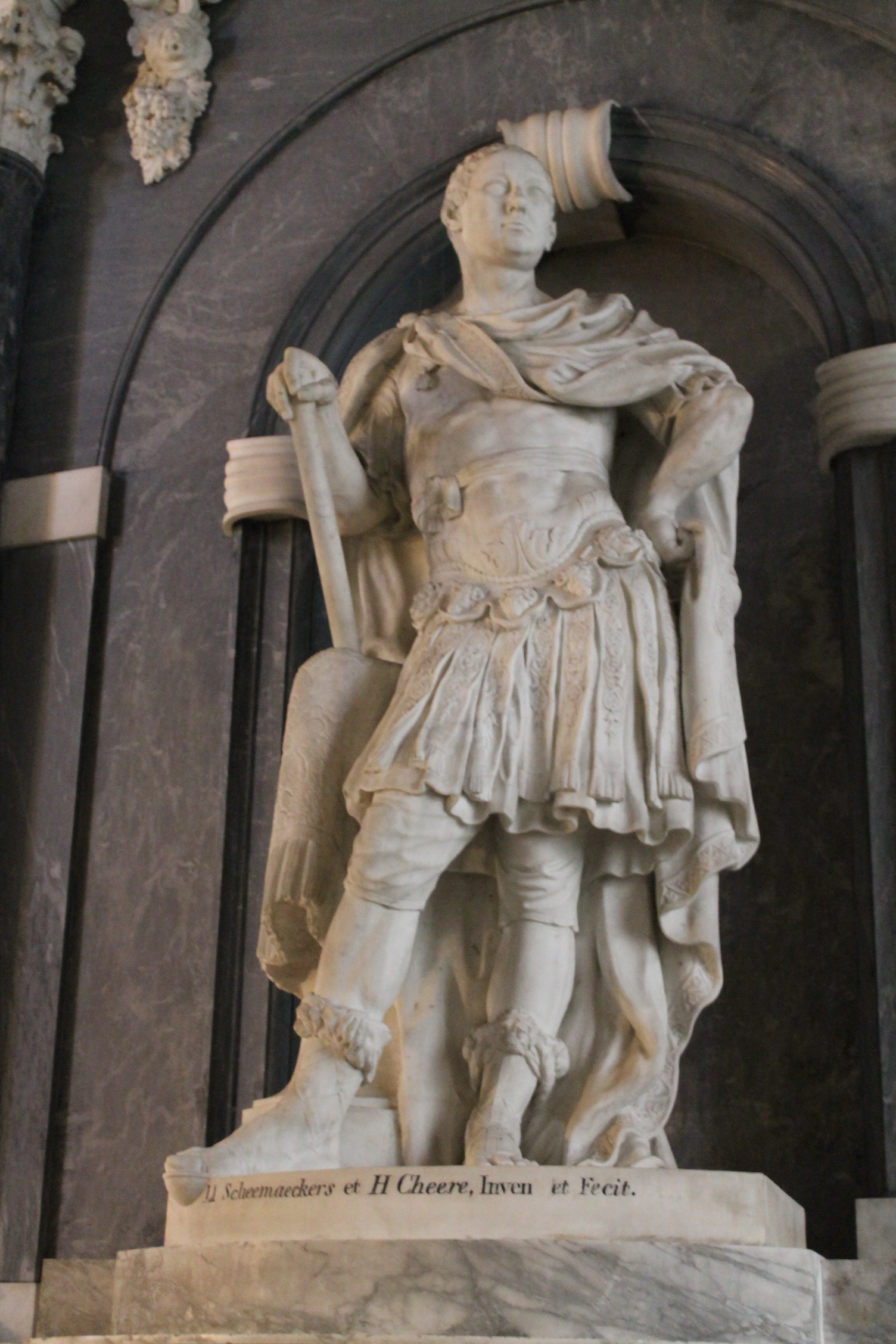
Robert Bertie monument, Edenham church (with H Cheere)

- Monument to Richard Graves, Mickleton, Gloucestershire (1729)
- Monument to Sir Francis Page, Steeple Aston (1730)
- Monument to John Bradbury, Wicken Bonhunt (1731)
