= Édouard Delvaux =

- Born: Édouard Delvaux ca. 1806; Brussels, First French Empire
- Died: ca. 1862; Spa, Belgium
- Occupation: Painter

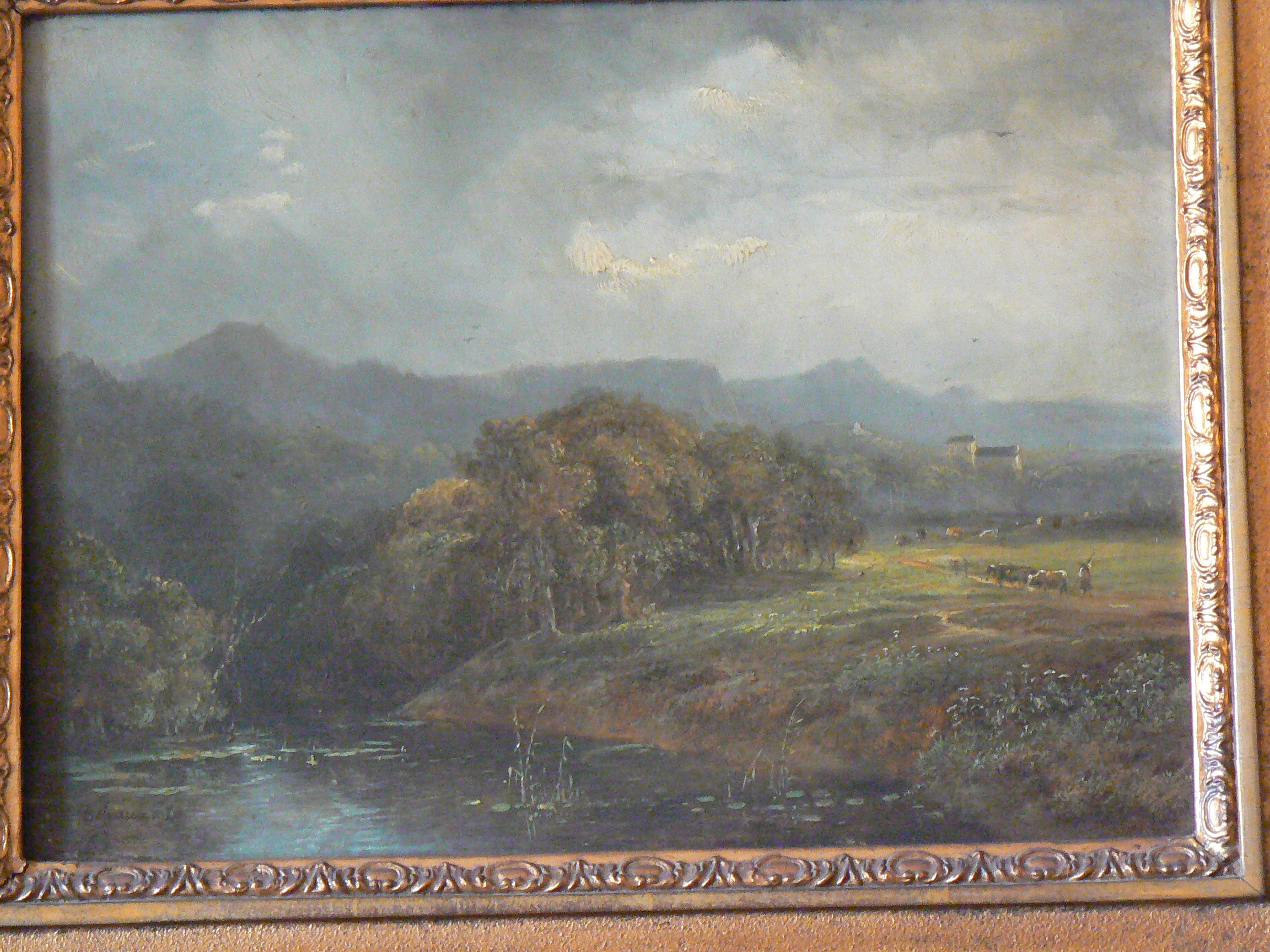
Paysage bucolique, 1840s (wood, 32x24cm)

Édouard Delvaux (French: [dɛlvo]; Brussels, c. 1806 – Spa, 1862) was a Belgian Romantic painter. The grandson of the sculptor Laurent Delvaux and apprentice of the painter Henri Van Assche, his work mainly consisted of bucolic rural scenes from his many trips to France, Switzerland, Germany and Italy. He won silver medal at the 1836 Brussels exhibition and was director of the École de dessin at Spa.

== Sources ==
- Raymond Delvaux, Flor De Smedt, Felix Meurisse & Frans Jozef van Droogenbroeck, Het Kasteel van Walfergem, van Hof te Huseghem over Speelgoed van de familie t'Kint tot Landhuis van de familie Delvaux, Asse, Koninklijke Heemkring Ascania, Asse, 2007.
