= Salmon Morrice =

Royal Navy commander (1672 – 1740)

Admiral Salmon Morrice (11 April 1672 – 25 March 1740) was a Royal Navy officer and Vice-admiral of the White.

== Life ==
He was born on 11 April 1672 in Stepney to Captain William Morrice RN of Werrington in Devonshire (now part of Cornwall) and his wife Jane Salmon.

He went into service in 1690, somewhat late by the standards of the day, as a first lieutenant on HMS York. On this very large ship, he served under three captains: Robert Deane, George Mees and James Killigrew, the latter being killed in his role. On HMS York, he saw quite a bit of action: the battles of Beachy Head (1690) and Barfleur (1692), and the captures of the French ship La Marianne (1693), the privateer Le Saint Antoine (1693), and the Jacobite privateer Prince of Wales (1693).

In April 1695 he was created commander of the newly completed 4-gun HMS Comet, serving in Newfoundland. In February 1696 he transferred to the slightly larger HMS Carcass.

In May 1697 he was promoted to captain and given command of the 18-gun HMS Royal Transport. This ship was gifted to the Russian Navy, and from November 1698 to May 1699 Morrice took extended leave. He was then given command of HMS Newport, a 24-gunner under the command of Admiral Richard Coote and serving in the Americas and the West Indies. In these duties, he was placed in both Boston Harbour and New York Harbour and may have been involved in the capture of the pirate Captain Kidd. In October 1702 he took command of HMS Firm, a freshly captured French ship of 70 guns. This commission was as an Advice Prize (advance prize), as he was responsible for its capture in Vigo Bay.

In July 1703 he was made captain of HMS Advice, the ship which had earlier taken Captain Kidd to England for execution, and took part of the capture of the French privateer La Saint Sulplice in May 1704. He then before commanded HMS Romney from December 1705 serving in the North Sea. He changed again in March 1706 to the elderly but recently refitted HMS Monck of 64 guns. He served in the Mediterranean and North Sea and captured a French Navy vessel and a French privateer in the English Channel: La Conquerante (1709); and Le Saint Francois D'Assise (1710).

On Christmas Day 1710, he moved to HMS Canterbury, a 60-gunner mainly based in the Channel and North Sea. The only significant action was the capture of La Duchesse D'Aumont in 1711. In 1714 he was given a shore based command as Commander-in-Chief of Portsmouth Naval Docks, a fairly important role. He held this post for nine years. This may be linked to his purchase in 1712 of Northborne Manor near Betteshanger probably due to marriage (see below).

In April 1723 he returned to sea as captain and commander of the huge but elderly HMS Sandwich, a 90-gunner. However, this ship was then solely used as a guardship based at Blackstakes, a rock outcrop in the Medway. In February 1725 he moved to the faster HMS Nassau. which had 70 guns but only replaced HMS Sandwich as the guardship at Medway. In November 1726 he briefly moved to HMS Union, another 90-gunner. However, this post was purely symbolic, as the ship was not in active service at that point and was undergoing extensive works in Chatham Docks.

After another six month interlude he was created Rear-Admiral of the White on 21 April 1727 under Admiral Sir John Norris. This position gave him command of central section of the Fleet, which was divided into Red, White, and Blue sections. He served in both the Red (advance) and Blue (vanguard) sections before becoming Vice Admiral of the White. As he was not assigned to a specific ship during his admiralcy, it is hard to establish if he did or did not see active service. However, he did sail with the whole fleet in May 1727 in a delegation to Copenhagen. Morrice retired in June 1732 at the age of 60.

He died on 25 March 1740 at the age of 68. His tomb, lying in a small vault attaching the side of the local church, was sculpted by Peter Scheemakers.

== Family ==
He married Elizabeth Wright (1685-1733), daughter of William Wright, a Royal Navy Commissioner. Wright's position would have (and seems to have) enabled him to give his son-in-law "safer" posts and certainly posts less far from home in Betteshanger.

They had two sons and four daughters, including Wryght Morrice who married Sarah Peke, and William Morrice (died 1758) who married Mary Chadwick, daughter of Captain Robert Chadwick RN of Northsleet.

William had a son, also named William, who was a lieutenant colonel in the dragoons and inherited the estate at Betteshanger.

A nephew seems to have also been named Salmon Morrice (1688–1740).
