= 1677 Construction Programme =

Group of 17th century Royal Navy ships

Class overview
- Name: 1677 Construction Programme
- Builders: Portsmouth Dockyard; Deptford Dockyard; Harwich Dockyard; Chatham Dockyard; Woolwich Dockyard; Francis Bayley, Bristol; Sir Henry Johnson, Blackwall
- Operators: Kingdom of England; Kingdom of Great Britain after 1707
- Preceded by: Royal Oak
- Succeeded by: 1691 Programme Group
- Built: 1677–1680
- In service: 1679–1765
- Completed: 20
- Lost: 13
- Retired: 7

General characteristics 1677 Specifications
- Type: 70/62-gun third-rate ship of the line
- Tons burthen: 1,012 65/94 tons (bm)
- Length: 150 ft 0 in (45.72 m) gundeck; 121 ft 0 in (36.88 m) keel for tonnage
- Beam: 39 ft 8 in (12.09 m)
- Depth of hold: 17 ft 0 in (5.18 m)
- Sail plan: ship-rigged
- Complement: 1677 – 460/380/300 personnel
- Armament: 1677 Establishment 70/62 guns; 26 × demi-cannons 54 cwt – 9.5 ft (LD); 26 × 12-pdr guns 32 cwt – 9 ft (UD); 10 × sakers 16 cwt – 7 ft (QD); 4 × sakers 16 cwt – 7 ft (Fc); 4 × 3-pdr guns 5 cwt – 5 ft (RH)

The 1677 Construction Programme was a group of Royal Navy ships of the line approved on 5 March 1677. This program authorised the construction of thirty new warships for the Royal Navy and was a compromise between the 40 ship programme proposed by Samuel Pepys in 1675 and the Parliamentary counter proposal of twenty ships in 1676. This programme included the construction of one first rate, nine second rates, and twenty third rate naval vessels.

== Design and specifications ==
The design was to initiate standardisation in the ships to include the mast structures, rigging to stabilise the masts, and the sail plans. Included in this standardisation were the ordnance carried and crew size. The dimensions of the ships were to a standardised formula, though individual shipbuilders were still allowed to tweak the designs of individual ships. The standardised dimensions were for a gundeck of 150 feet 0 inches (45.72 metres) with a keel (length for tonnage calculation) of 121 feet 0 inches (36.88 metres) with a breadth of 39 feet 8 inches (12.09 metres) and a depth of hold on 17 feet 0 inches (5.18 metres) to obtain a builder's measure tonnage of 1,012 65/94 tons.

The vessels were to have twenty-six gunports on both the lower and upper decks split evenly at thirteen per deck per side. Three vessels (Lenox, Hampton Court, and Captain) were initially to be completed with only twelve-gunports on the upper deck per side. The initial gun establishment would be for 70 guns in wartime and 62 guns for peacetime consisting of twenty-six demi-cannons (54 cwt, 9.5 ft) on the lower deck, twenty-six 12-pounder guns (32 cwt, 9 ft) on the upper deck, ten sakers (16 cwt, 7 ft) on the quarterdeck and four sakers (16 cwt, 7 ft) on the foc's'le with four 3-pounder guns (5 cwt, 5 ft) on the poop deck or roundhouse.

As time progressed the established armament of the ships changed. In 1685 the gun armament changed to twenty-two demi-cannons and four culverins on the lower deck with the remaining guns being unchanged, In 1703 the guns were changed again. The Establishment for a 70/62-gun Third Rate was now twenty-four/twenty-two 24-pounder guns on the lower deck, twenty-six/twenty-four 9-pounder guns on the upper deck, Twelve/ten 6-pounder guns on the quarterdeck, four/two 6-pounder guns on the foc's’le, and four 4-pounder guns on the poop deck or roundhouse. The actual composition of the gun armaments varied and will be specified on the individual ship articles.

The established crew complement for a Third Rate for sailors (personnel for the working of sails and rigging) would initially be 160 personnel, though it was later reduced to 150 personnel. Each gun would be assigned a specific gun manning: i.e. six men for a demi-cannon (or 32-pounder), culverins (or 18-pounder) would have five men, a 12-pounder would have four, sakers would have three men per gun and 5-pounders would have two men per gun. The establishment for a Third Rate was for a crew of 460/380/300 personnel based on the armament carried and whether it was wartime or peacetime conditions and the number of guns carried.

Within this programme many new names would be instituted. Four vessels would be named for the illegitimate sons of the King, Charles II. HMS Lenox would be named for Charles Lennox, created the Duke of Lennox in 1675. HMS Burford would be named for Charles Beauclerk, created the Duke of Burford in 1676. HMS Grafton was named for Henry Fitzroy, created the Duke of Grafton in 1675. HMS Northumberland was named for George Fitzroy, created the Duke of Northumberland in 1678.

== Third Rates of the 1677 Programme ==
First Batch (1677 Orders)
Ship's Name	Builder	Launch Date	Remarks
Lenox	Deptford Dockyard	18 April 1678	Rebuilt Deptford 1701; Rebuilt Chatham 1721–26; sunk as breakwater Sheerness April 1756
Hampton Court	Deptford Dockyard	10 July 1678	Rebuilt Blackwall 1701; taken by French 2 May 1707
Anne	Chatham Dockyard	November 1678	Ran ashore and burnt to avoid capture 6 July 1690
Restoration	Harwich Dockyard	28 May 1678	Rebuilt Portsmouth 1702; Wrecked in Great Storm 26/27 November 1703
Berwick	Chatham Dockyard	May 1679	Rebuilt Deptford 1700; Hulked at Portsmouth October 1715; Broken at Portsmouth 1742
Burford	Woolwich Dockyard	November 1679	Rebuilt Deptford 1699; Wrecked 14 February 1719
Eagle	Portsmouth Dockyard	31 January 1679	Rebuilt Chatham 1699; Wrecked 22 October 1707
Expedition	Portsmouth Dockyard	10 September 1679	Rebuilt at Chatham 1699; Rebuilt Portsmouth 1709–14; Renamed Prince Frederick 2 January 1715; Rebuilt Deptford 1736–40; Converted to Lazerette 1764; Sold 1784
Grafton	Woolwich Dockyard	17 May 1679	Rebuilt at Rotherhithe 1697; Captured off Brighton by French 2 May 1707
Pendennis	Chatham Dockyard	1679	Wrecked on Kentish Knock 26 October 1689
Northumberland	Francis Bayley, Bristol	June 1679	Rebuilt Chatham 1699–1702; Wrecked in Great Storm 26/27 November 1703
Captain	Woolwich Dockyard	1678	Laid up 1699 and rebuilt at Portsmouth 1706–08; Rebuilt Portsmouth Dockyard 1706/08; Rebuilt Portsmouth Dockyard 1720/22; Hulked Portsmouth 1739/40; Breaking completed Portsmouth May 1762

Second Batch (1678 Orders)
Ship's Name	Builder	Launch Date	Remarks
Essex	Sir Henry Johnson, Blackwall	1679	Rebuilt at Rotherhithe 1699–1700; Rebuilt Woolwich Dockyard 1736–40; Wrecked Quiberon Bat 22 October 1759
Kent	Sir Henry Johnson, Blackwall	1679	Rebuilt at Rotherhithe 1697–99; Rebuilt at Woolwich 1722; Breaking completed in December 1744
Exeter	Sir Henry Johnson, Blackwall	March 1680	Burnt by Accident Portsmouth 12 December 1691, hulked at Portsmouth and broken 1717
Suffolk	Sir Henry Johnson, Blackwall	May 1680	Rebuilt Blackwall 1699; Rebuilt Chatham 1716/18; Rebuilt Woolwich 1736–39; Broken 12 June 1765
Hope	Robert Castle, Deptford	1678	Captured by French 16 April 1695, in French service, destroyed at Battle of Vigo 12 October 1702
Elizabeth	Robert Castle, Deptford	3 March 1679	Rebuilt Portsmouth 1699–1704; Captured by French 23 November 1704
Stirling Castle	Deptford Dockyard	29 July 1679	Rebuilt Chatham 1699; Wrecked in Great Storm 26/27 November 1703
Bredah	Harwich Dockyard	26 September 1679	Destroyed by explosion in Cork Harbour 12 October 1690
