= Pierre Scheemackers =

18C French sculptor

Pierre Scheemackers (c.1728 - 1765) was a sculptor in mid-18th century Paris.

A member of the Scheemaeckers family of sculptors from Antwerp and of Flemish descent through both his parents, Pierre Scheemackers was born in London but grew up and worked as a sculptor in Paris where he was admitted to the Académie de Saint-Luc in 1755, and was later appointed teaching Professor there.

Pierre was the elder son of sculptor Henry Scheemakers (c.1686-1748) of London and Paris, nephew of sculptor Peter Scheemakers The Younger (1691-1781) of London, and grandson of sculptor Pieter Scheemaeckers of Antwerp. Pierre's younger brother Thomas-Henry became known as sculptor Thomas Scheemakers (c.1740-1808) of London.

== Life ==
Pierre's father was born Hendrik (Henry) Scheemaekers in Flanders to sculptor Pieter Scheemaeckers and Catharina van der Hulst of Antwerp. Hendrik settled in Westminster by 1726, when "Henry Scheemakers, Statuary", is recorded as taking as apprentice John van Nost. The following year 1727, Henry Scheemakers married Catherine Hennekin, daughter of Flemish-born Michiel (Michael) Hennekin, who had been apprenticed to the great sculptor Jan Claudius de Cock in 1697; Catherine’s brother Simon was a London carver and gilder, as was his son George Michael Hennekin.

Pierre or Peter Scheemakers was born around 1728 in London, where his father was based in Old Palace Yard next to the Palace of Westminster and in partnership with the sculptor Henry Cheere. His brother Michael (named after their grandfather Michael Hennekin) and sister Catherine both died young and were buried at St Margaret's Westminster in 1731 and September 1734 respectively, before the family moved to Paris. Pierre and his surviving siblings were named as their father's heirs after Henry died in Paris in July 1748, as Pierre, Thomas-Henry, Marie-Louise, and Geneviève-Catherine.

Which Paris sculptor taught Pierre is not known, but several were already connected to the family at the time of his father's death in 1748. These included the children's deputy guardian (subrogé tuteur), sculptor Jean-Baptiste or Jean-Jacques Poullet; Pierre Danse and Denis Robinot, both sculptors on rue Meslé (now Meslay) where the Scheemackers were living; and Denis Coulonjon, living at the Cour du Grand Maitre de l'Arsenal. The most prestigious of his father's former colleagues was the sculptor Paul-Ambroise Slodtz (1702-1758), sculpteur ordinaire du Roi on the rue du Vieux Louvre, member of the Académie royale de peinture et de sculpture, and son of Antwerp-born Sébastien Slodtz (1655-1726), former Court sculptor and Rector of the Académie de Saint-Luc.

On 15 October 1755, Pierre Scheemackers (the French spelling of the family name) was admitted to the Académie de Saint-Luc. He exhibited several items at the Academy's Salon the following year 1756, also at the Salons of 1762 and 1764. His exhibits were described as :

At the Salon of 1756:

- Vierge. Statue executée pour l'église de Saint-Hilaire, près le Puits-Certain.
- Un modèle d'une figure représentant la Sculpture.
- Deux dessins de chaire à precher, l'un représentant le Temple de la Vérité soutenu par les quatre Evangélistes, projet destiné à la chaire de Saint-Roch, l'autre représentant l'Eglise pour la chaire de Saint-Merry.
- Un fou qui fait faire silence, tandis qu'il gratte les doigts de son pied droit.
- Un dessin, au crayon rouge, d'un tombeau de sénateur.

At the Salon of 1762:

- Une petite baigneuse de 2 pieds de proportion.
- Une petite tête d'enfant, en terre cuite.
- Hébé, une grande figure en pierre.

At the Salon of 1764:

- Un enfant jouant avec des cerises et un papillon.
- Deux esquisses, l'une représentant la Prudence, et l'autre le Plaisir.
- Dix dessins de différents vases à la romaine, sur la même feuille.
- Des dessins de chaires à prêcher.
- Projet du palais du roi d'Angleterre, qui doit être bâti sur le terrain où est le Palais de Saint-James, à Londres. Dessin d'architecture de 3 pieds de large.

These translate as:

1756:

- Virgin, statue created for the church of Saint-Hilaire, Paris (the reference to Puits-Certains is unclear).
- A model of a figure representing Sculpture.
- Two pulpit designs, one representing the Temple of Trust supported by the four Evangelists for the pulpit in (the church of) Saint-Roch, Paris the other representing The Church for the pulpit in (the church of) Saint-Merri.
- A fool (or lunatic) calling for silence whilst he scratches his toes on his right foot.
- A red pencil drawing of a senator's tomb.

1762:

- A female bather 2 feet high.
- A small child's head in terracotta.
- Hebe, a large figure in stone.

1764:

- A child playing with cherries and a butterfly.
- Two sketches, one representing Prudence, the other Pleasure.
- Ten designs of different vases in the Roman style, on the same sheet.
- Two designs for pulpits.
- Draft design for the Palace of the King of England, which is to be built on the ground where St James's Palace lies in London. Architectural design 3 feet wide.

In January 1764 Pierre Scheemackers was appointed full Professeur at the Académie de Saint-Luc, but died the following year, on 19 October 1765, at his address on the Boulevard du Pont aux Choux in the parish of Saint-Nicolas, Paris.

Pierre Scheemackers had married Anne-Julie Revel in Paris in August 1751. Their only surviving child was Marie-Julie Scheemackers, who had three children : Marie-Françoise-Julie Dubourg, later wife of Charles-Louis-Vincent Thibault; Victor-Honoré-Louis Dubourg; and Marie-Antoinette Dubourg, later wife of Jean-Joseph-Pillioud. The three Dubourgs were left legacies by Pierre's brother, their great-uncle sculptor Thomas Scheemakers of London, who had died childless in 1808. Thanks to sculptor Joseph Nollekens as second executor to Thomas' Will, in May 1815 the Dubourgs received their legacies of £433.6s.8d each in Bank of England funds, due to them since 1810 after the death of Thomas' widow but delayed by the Napoleonic Wars.
