= Peter Scheemakers =

18th-century London-based Flemish-born sculptor

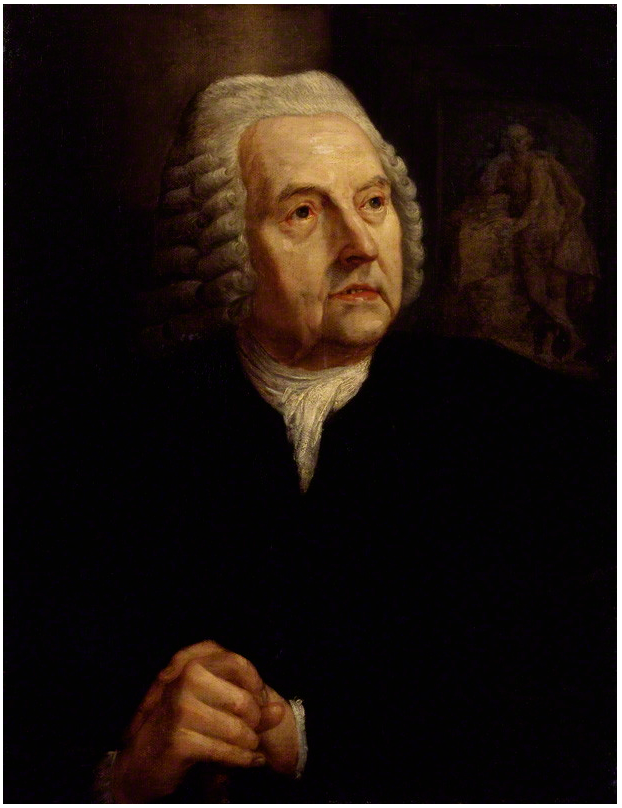
- Portrait of Scheemakers by Andreas Bernardus de Quertenmont
- Born: 1691, Antwerp
- Died: 12 September 1781 (aged 90), Antwerp
- Known for: Sculpture
- Notable work: Tomb monuments and garden statuary
- Patrons: William Kent

Peter Scheemakers or Pieter Scheemaeckers II or the Younger (10 January 1691 – 12 September 1781) was a Flemish sculptor who worked for most of his life in London. His public and church sculptures in a classicist style had an important influence on the development of modern sculpture in England.

Scheemakers is perhaps best known for executing the William Kent-designed memorial to William Shakespeare which was erected in Poets' Corner in Westminster Abbey in 1740, as well as that to John Dryden in the same church.

== Biography ==
=== Early life ===
Peter Scheemakers the Younger was born in Antwerp and baptised Pieter-Caspar Scheemaekers at the Sint-Jacobskerk or St. James' Church, Antwerp on 10 January 1691, son of sculptor Peter Scheemaekers aka Pieter Scheemaeckers and Catharina van der Hulst (d.1712). His eldest brother Hendrik (Henry) Scheemakers' baptism has not been found, but Peter's other siblings were: Catharina baptised 1 October 1688 (died young), Elisabeth baptised 6 July 1693 (still living when Peter wrote his Will in 1771), Jan-Frans baptised 2 February 1696 (ditto), and another Catharina baptised 20 March 1698 (died before 1771 leaving one daughter), all baptised at the St Jacobskerk in Antwerp.

Peter followed his father as a sculptor, and joined his elder brother Henry Scheemakers working in Copenhagen, Denmark, for the court sculptor Johann Adam Sturmberg (1683–1741), for two years 1718–1720. It is said that in 1715 Peter walked from Copenhagen to Rome (over 1500 km) where he studied both classical and baroque styles of sculpture.

=== London, 1720–1730 ===
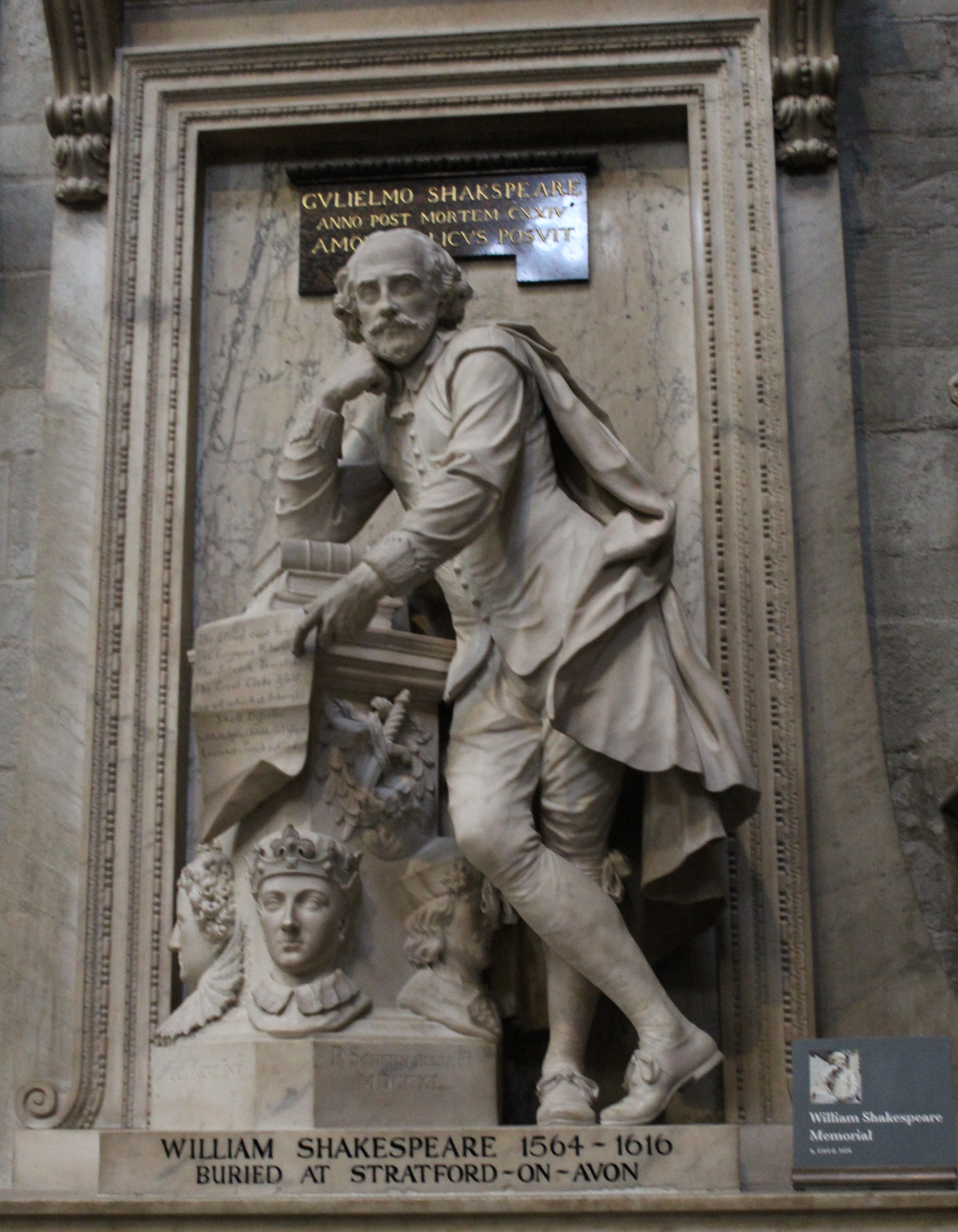
The Shakespeare memorial in Poets' Corner, Westminster Abbey

In about 1720 Scheemakers settled in London where he befriended fellow Flemish sculptor, Gent-born Laurent Delvaux (1696–1778), who had been in London since 1717 on the recommendation of his former Master, Antwerp-born Pierre-Denis Plumier. At the time, Pierre-Denis Plumier was still in Brussels, but he came to London in early 1721 with his family, intending to settle permanently. Plumier had started on a funerary monument to John Sheffield, Duke of Buckingham, when he died only a few months after his arrival. The monument was completed by Peter Scheemakers and Laurent Delvaux in partnership, and installed in Westminster Abbey in 1722. By 1726, his brother Henry Scheemakers had also settled in London, in Old Palace Yard in St Margaret's Westminster, staying here until he moved to Paris in the mid-1730s.

Scheemakers and Delvaux then entered into a formal partnership and set up a workshop in Millbank, south of Westminster in London, in 1723. Their workshop produced many sober classical monuments and garden statuary in the Antique style. However, in order to finance their long-planned trips to study both antique and recent masterpieces in Rome, the two partners sold their stock in April 1728, including 30 items Delvaux had inherited from Plumier on marrying his widow in 1726, and the two sculptors travelled to Rome in 1728. Delvaux stayed in Rome until 1733 when he was appointed Court Sculptor in Brussels, but Scheemakers stayed only two years before returning to England in 1730.

=== London, 1730–1771 ===
Upon his return Scheemakers restarted the Millbank workshop in St Martin's Lane. His 'ideal' classical sculptures became very popular with the landowning class and the city merchants. He moved his workshop twice more: first to Old Palace Yard in St Margaret's Westminster in 1736 and then in 1740 to Vine Street in St James's where he stayed until he retired in 1771.

Scheemakers worked for a time with Francis Bird, and his brother Henry Scheemakers was in partnership with Henry Cheere for a few years. Peter taught Charles Cope Trubshaw and Thomas Banks. In 1750 he took as apprentice sculptor Joseph Nollekens (1737–1823), son of fellow Antwerp-born artist Josef Frans Nollekens (1702–1748), who stayed on as journeyman before leaving for Rome around 1762. Nollekens must have remained close to Peter's Vine Street successor, his nephew Thomas Scheemakers, as Thomas appointed Nollekens as one of his executors.

Peter Scheemakers had married Barbara La Fosse but they had no children. His brother, sculptor Henry Scheemakers (c.1686–1748), had moved to Paris in the mid-1730s and both Henry's sons had also become sculptors. The elder, Peter, known as Pierre Scheemackers (c.1728–1765), remained in Paris where he became a professor at the Académie de Saint-Luc, but died shortly afterwards in 1765. Henry's younger son Thomas-Henry known as Thomas Scheemakers (c.1740–1808) left Paris to join his uncle Peter in London, leasing the workshop in Vine Street after Peter retired in 1771, and referred to at his death in 1808 as "Thomas Scheemakers of Vine Street, Statuary".

=== Later years ===
Peter Scheemakers retired in 1771, aged 80, his wife Barbara having died in 1768, and returned to live with his siblings Elisabeth and Francis in their native town of Antwerp. He died there in September 1781 and was buried in the same church in which he had been baptised over 90 years earlier.

Peter Scheemakers "native of Antwerp but now of Vine Street in the parish of St James Westminster, Statuary" had signed his Will in London on 19 June 1771, witnessed by William Lister and Sarah Whip. Probate was granted on 24 September 1781. His bequests were 10 guineas to Peter's mason Christopher Finny; the same to Mr Vandermeulen, Statuary; and the same again to Mr Dennis Byrne. 20 guineas to his servant. £50 to his niece Anna-Maria Vandiepenbeeck; the same to Mr James Bucher [sic], haberdasher of Pall Mall, who was also appointed sole executor. All the rest of Peter's effects in England were to be divided equally into four parts and distributed between his 4 siblings or if deceased, their descendants: ¼ to sister Elisabeth Scheemaekers, ¼ to brother Frans (Jan-Frans) Scheemaekers, ¼ to niece Anna-Maria Vandiepenbeeck as sole child of deceased sister Catharina, ¼ to be shared equally between the surviving children of deceased brother Henry viz. nephew Thomas Scheemakers and Thomas's two sisters Marie-Louise and Genevieve-Catherine. These provisions confirm that Peter was childless and that Thomas Scheemakers, the London sculptor hitherto assumed to be his son and sole heir, was Peter's nephew and received just 1/12th of Peter's estate.

== Works ==
=== Westminster Abbey ===
Peter Scheemakers created 16 works – monuments, figures, busts and tombs – for Westminster Abbey alone, of which 15 are still in situ:

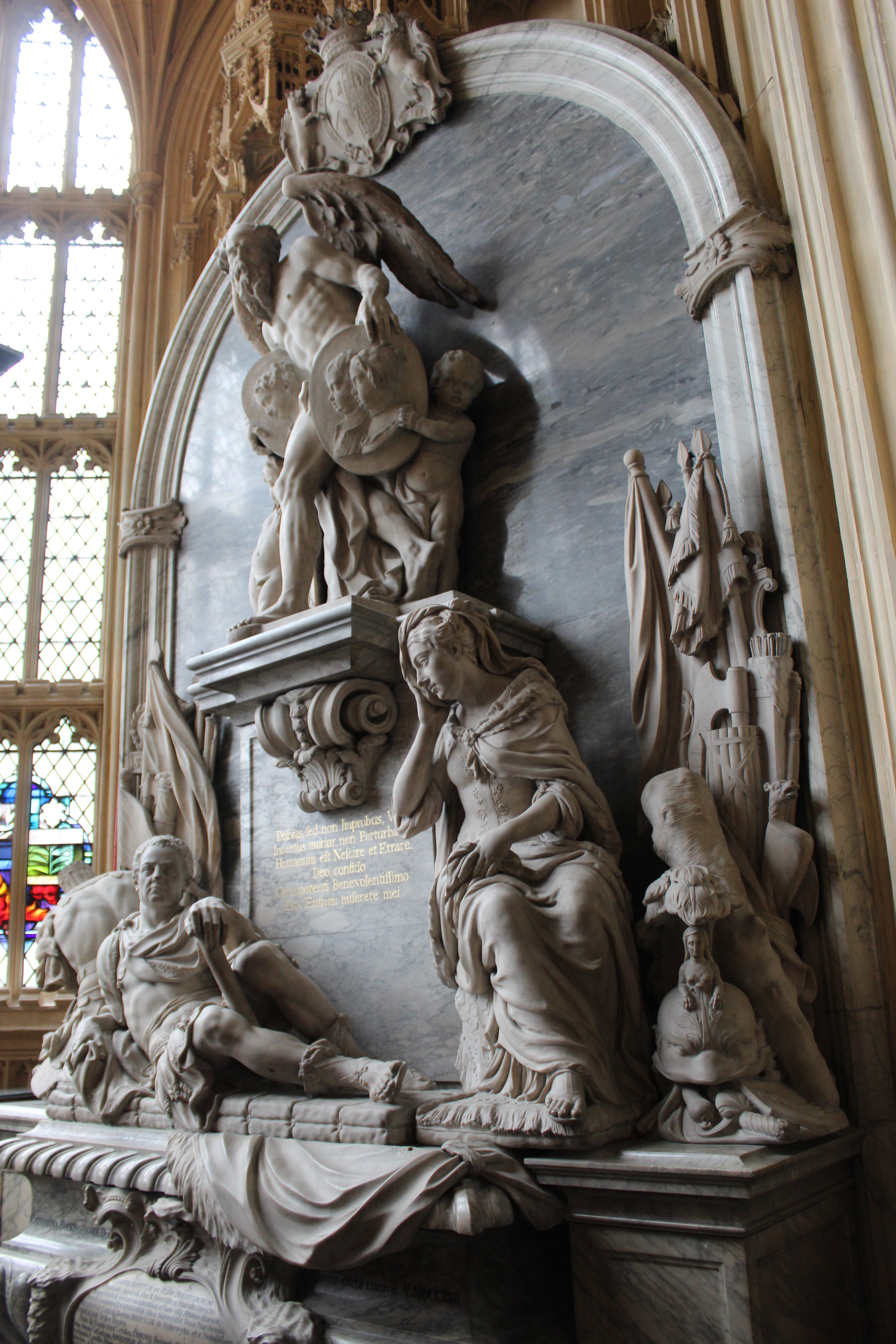
Monument to John Sheffield, Duke of Buckingham, Westminster Abbey

- Monument to William Shakespeare (1740), Peter Scheemakers' most admired work. However, as this was designed by William Kent, the admiration for design and execution should rightly be shared.
- Monument to John Sheffield, 1st Duke of Buckingham and Normanby d.Feb 1721. Based on Plumier's design which he started, but completed by Peter Scheemakers and Laurent Delvaux after Plumier's unexpected death. Dedicated in 1722.
- Monument to Dr Hugh Chamberlen d.June 1728, paid for by the widowed Duchess of Buckingham, and also executed in collaboration with Laurent Delvaux.
- Monument to Admiral Sir Charles Wager
- Monument to Vice-Admiral Watson
- Monument to Lt. General Percy Kirke
- Monument to George Howe, 3rd Viscount Howe
- Monument to General Monck, also designed by William Kent and executed by Peter Scheemakers
- Monument to Sir Henry Belasyse
- Bust of John Dryden (1720)
- Bust of Dr Richard Mead (1754)
- Memorial to Thomas Jordan (1736)
- Memorial to Lord Aubrey Beauclerk (1741)
- Memorial to Admiral Sir John Balchen (1744)
- Memorial to William Horneck
- Tomb of Dr John Woodward (d.1728)
- Tomb of Magdalen Walsh (d.1747). The latter was relocated due to the placement of the Memorial to the Armed Forces in 2008.

=== Other works in England ===
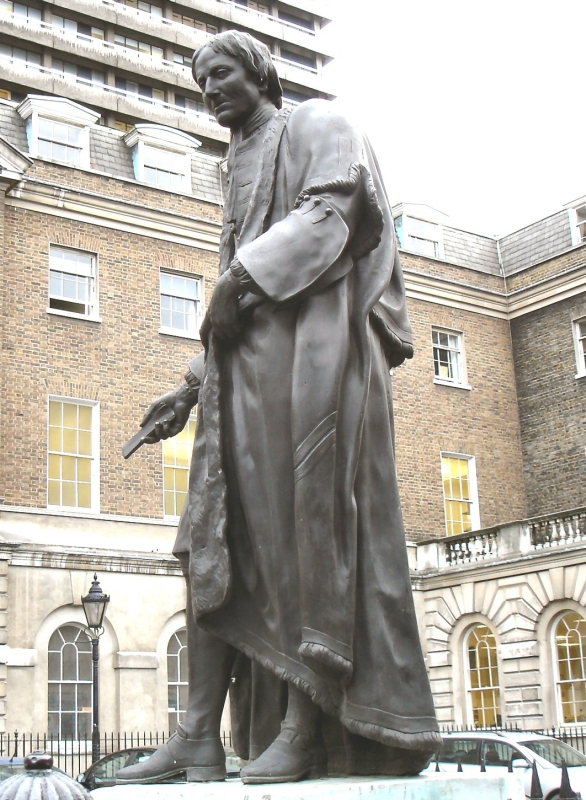
Statue of Thomas Guy

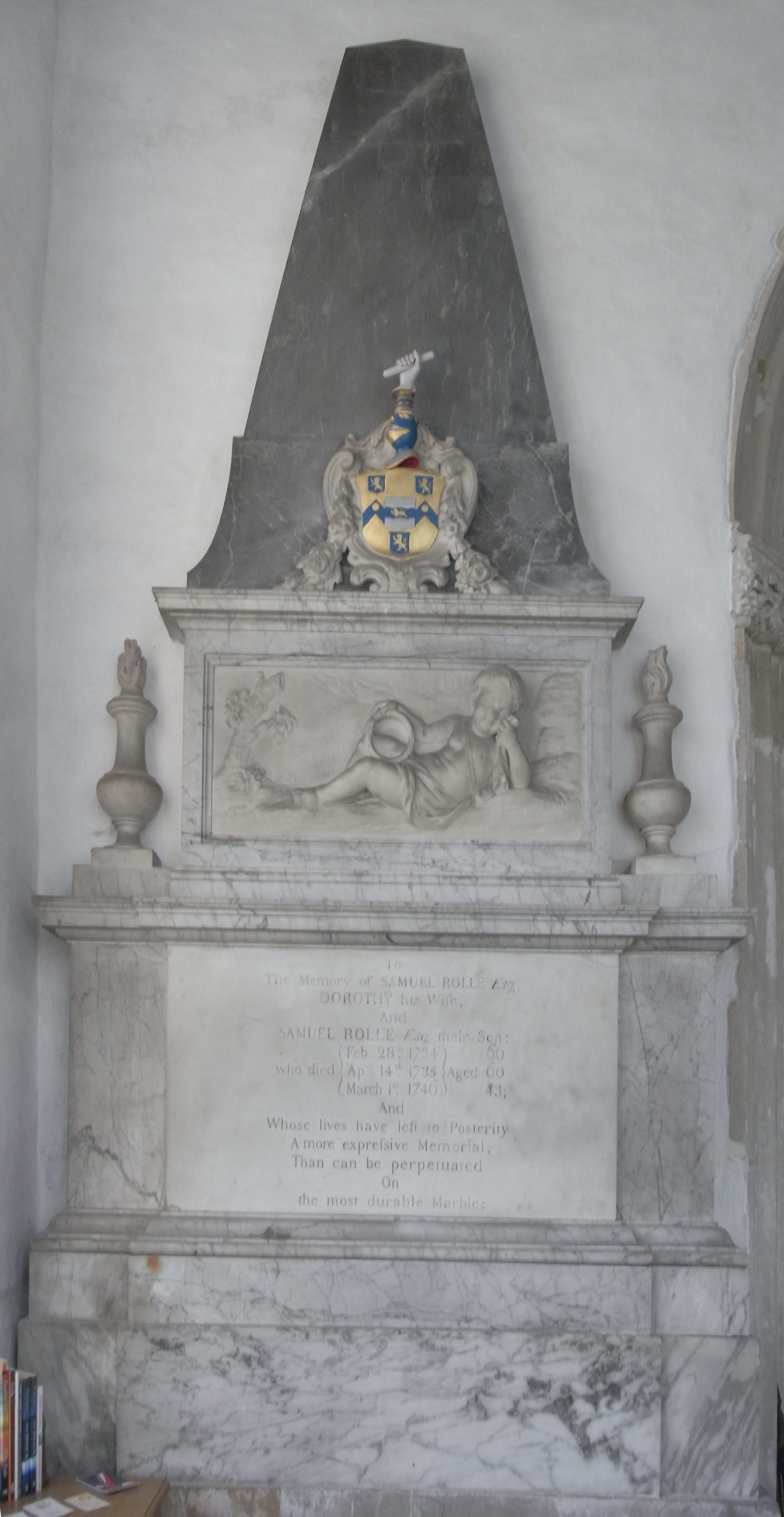
Samuel Rolle monument in Chittlehampton Church

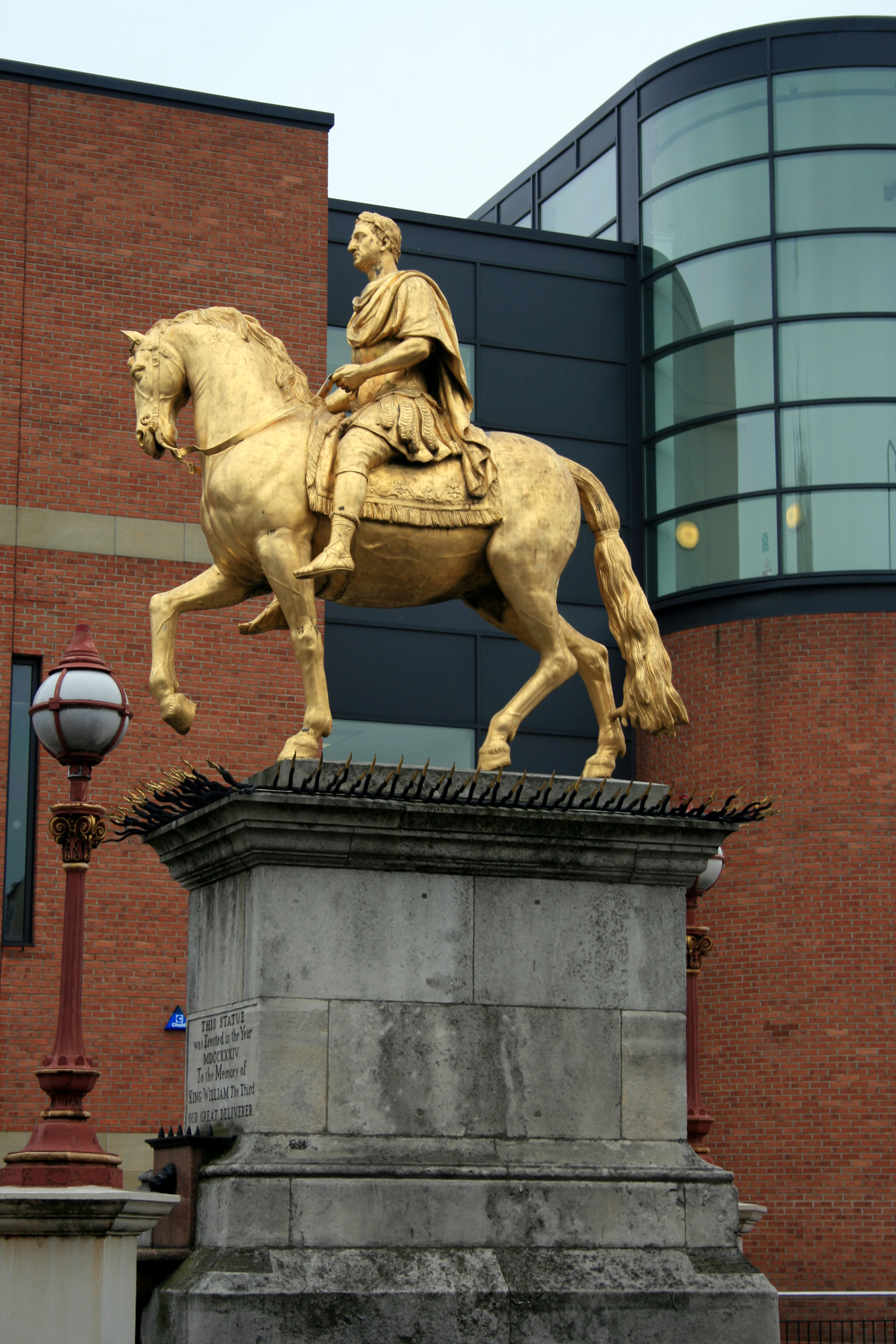
William III in Hull

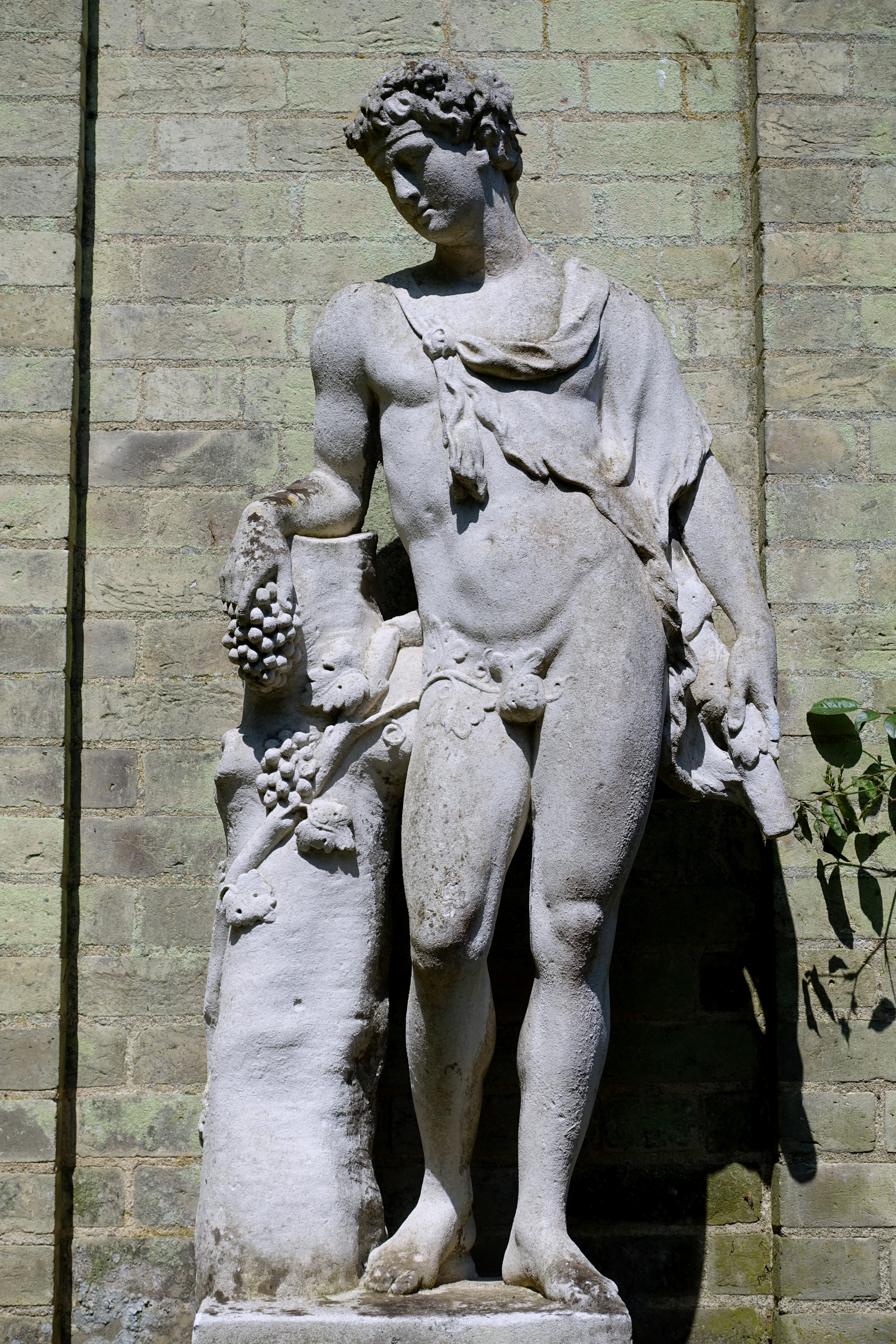
Bacchus, Wrest Park, Bedfordshire

- Monument to Sir Michael Warton (c.1730) in Beverley Minster
- Monument to Montague Garrard Drake (c.1730) in Amersham
- Monument to Sir Thomas Hodgson (1732) in Barnby-upon-Don, Yorkshire
- Monument to William Douglas (1732) in St Lawrence's Church in Reading, Berkshire
- Monument to Sir John Potenger and his wife Philadelphia Ernle (1733) in Blunsdon, Wiltshire
- Statue of Thomas Guy (1734) in the courtyard of Guy's Hospital, London
- Equestrian statue of William III, Kingston upon Hull (1734)
- Statue of Sir John Barnard (1737) for Royal Exchange, London
- Statue of King Edward VI (1737) in St Thomas's Hospital, London
- Memorial (with busts) to Sir Thomas Reeve and his wife (1737) in John the Baptist Church in Windsor
- Memorial to Lady Newton of Culverthorpe Hall (1737) in Heydour Parish Church, Lincolnshire
- Memorial to Lord and Lady Curzon of Kedleston Hall (1737) in Kedleston Parish Church, Derbyshire
- Memorial to Sir George Beaumont, 4th Baronet (1737) in Stoughton, Leicestershire
- Memorial to Charles Fleetwood (1737) in Ely Cathedral
- Memorial to Sir Justinian Isham, 5th Baronet (1737) in Lamport, Northamptonshire
- Memorial to Dr Samuel Palmer FRS (1738) in Wandsworth Parish Church
- Memorial to Mary daughter of John Hanger (1739) in St Michael's Church, Bray, Berkshire
- Statue of Marwood Turner (1739) in Kirkleatham, Yorkshire
- Bust of William Harvey (1739) in the Royal College of Physicians
- Memorial to Lady Elizabeth Hastings (1739) in Ledston, West Yorkshire
- Memorial to John Rudge (1740) in Wheatfield, Oxfordshire
- Bust of Earl Temple of Stowe (1740) at Stowe House
- Tomb of Admiral Salmon Morrice (1740) in St Mary's Church in Betteshanger, Kent
- Tomb of Susanna Hare (1741) in Stow Bardolph, Norfolk
- Tomb of Abraham Sharp (1742) in Bradford Cathedral
- Tomb of Sir Christopher Powell, 4th Baronet (1742) in Boughton Monchelsea, Kent
- Various statues (including the Dying Gladiator) (1743) at Rousham House, Oxfordshire
- Grave of Sir Michael Newton of Culverthorpe Hall (1746) in Heydour, Lincolnshire
- Tomb of Samuel Rolle (1746) in Chittlehampton Parish Church, Devon
- Bust of King Edward (1747) at King Edward's School, Birmingham
- Tomb of Thomas Lewis (1747) in Soberton, Hampshire
- Tomb of Admiral John Norris (1750) in St George's Church in Benenden, Kent
- Tomb of John Whitbread (grandfather of Samuel Whitbread) (1750) in Cardington, Bedfordshire
- Tomb of Sir Brook Bridges (1752) in Goodnestone, Kent
- Tomb of Robert Tothill and his wife (1753) in Urchfont, Wiltshire
- Tomb of Sir Jemmet Raymond (1754) in Kintbury, Berkshire
- Tomb of Margaret Verney, Lady Feversham (1755) in Downton, Wiltshire
- Tomb of Lord Raymond (1756) at Abbots Langley, Hertfordshire
- Bust of Roger Cotes (1758) in Trinity College, Cambridge
- Bust of Dr Robert Smith (1758) in Trinity College, Cambridge
- Grave of Sir Matthew Decker (1759) in St Mary Magdalene Church in Richmond, Surrey
- Tomb of Sir George Petre (1759) in St Mary's Church in Studley, Warwickshire
- Bust of Sir Paul Methuen (1764) at Corsham Court in Wiltshire
- Statues of Admiral Sir George Pocock, Lord Clive and General Laurence (1764) in the India Office in London
- Statuary group of Cain killing Abel (c.1760) at Chiswick House, London
- Bust of James Jurin (1766) in Trinity College, Cambridge
- Tom of Philip Yorke, 1st Earl of Hardwicke (1766) in Wimpole, Cambridgeshire
- Bust of Edward Wortley Montagu (1766) in Trinity College, Cambridge
- Busts of both the 3rd and 4th Earl of Shaftesbury (DNK) at St Giles House, Dorset
- Tablet to Mary Gardiner (died 1748) in St George's Church, Tombland, Norwich (signature visible on monument)
- Monument to George Strode (d.1753) in the Church of St Mary of the Annunciation, Beaminster, Dorset

Further works include memorials to the 1st and 2nd Dukes of Ancaster at Edenham, Lincolnshire; Lord Chancellor Hardwicke at Wimpole, Cambridgeshire; the Duke of Kent, his wives and daughters, at Flitton, Bedfordshire; the 1st Earl of Shelburne, in All Saints Church, High Wycombe, Buckinghamshire; and the figure on the sarcophagus to Montague Sherrard Drake, at Amersham, Buckinghamshire. Another example of his work is the memorial to Topham Foote (or Foot) in the parish church of St John the Baptist Church, Windsor. This burial monument, which includes the young man's bust and the Foote family crest, greets visitors in the main High Street entrance, 300 feet (90 m) from the Henry VIII gate to Windsor Castle. There is also a memorial to Sir Thomas Reeve, Chief Justice of the Common Pleas, 1736–37 in the church.

=== Ireland ===
In 1743, Mary Coghill erected the parish church of Clonturk (now Drumcondra Church) in memory of her brother Marmaduke Coghill, and placed in it a statue of her brother by Scheemakers.

He also was the sculptor of fourteen of the busts in the Long Room of the Trinity College Library in Dublin, including James Ussher, William Shakespeare, John Milton, John Locke, Cicero, Homer, Aristotle and Socrates.

=== On banknotes ===
Between 1970 and 1993, an image of Scheemakers's Shakespeare statue appeared on the reverse of Series D £20 notes issued by the Bank of England. Alongside the statue was an engraving of the balcony scene from Romeo and Juliet.

== See also ==
- Shugborough inscription
