= Francis Page (judge) =

English judge and politician

Sir Francis Page (1661 – 19 December 1741) was an English judge and politician who sat in the House of Commons from 1708 to 1713.

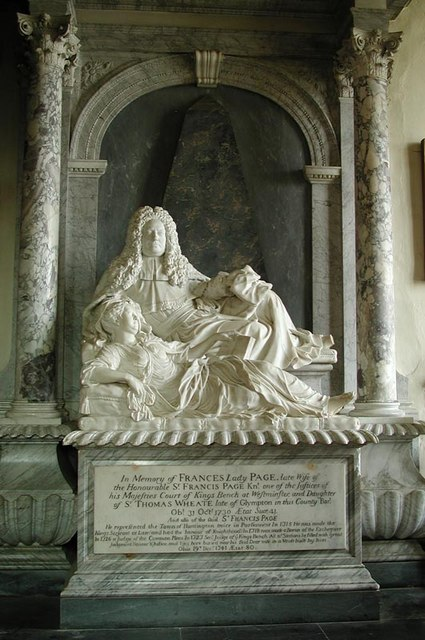
Memorial to Sir Francis Page and his second wife in Steeple Aston church, by Henry Scheemakers

Page was the son of Nicholas Page, vicar of Bloxham, Oxfordshire from 1663 to 1696. He entered Inner Temple in 1685 and was called to the bar in 1690. He married Isabella White of Greenwich, Kent on 18 December 1690. In 1704 he became Serjeant-at-law. He made a second marriage to Frances Wheate daughter of Sir Thomas Wheate, 1st Baronet on 11 October 1705.

Page was a trustee for the estates of the 3rd Earl of Sandwich, and so had access to the Montagu interest at Huntingdon. He was returned as Member of Parliament for Huntingdon in the 1708 general election. He was classed as a Whig, but there is some confusion between his activities and those of another Page in the House of Commons. He stood down at the 1713 general election in favour of Lord Hinchingbrooke who had now attained his majority. He does not appear to have sought an alternative seat then or later.

Page became bencher in 1713 and his career prospered under the Hanoverians. He became King's Serjeant 1715 and served on the special commission to try the rebels in Lancashire in 1715–16. He was promoted to Baron of the Exchequer in 1718. He was further promoted to Justice of the Court of Common Pleas in 1726 and of the King's Bench in 1727 when he was knighted. His coarseness and cruelty earned him a reputation as ‘the hanging judge’, and the singular distinction of being satirized by Pope, Fielding, Hogarth, Dr Johnson and the poet Richard Savage, over whose trial for murder he presided. Savage wrote of him:

Of heart impure and impotent of head,
In history, rhetoric, ethics, law unread;
How far unlike such worthies, once a drudge –
From floundering in law causes – rose a judge;
Formed to make pleaders laugh, his nonsense thunders,
And on low juries breathes contagious blunders;
His brothers blush, because no blush he knows,
Nor e’er one uncorrupted finger shows.

Page died without issue on 19 December 1741 age 80 years. He was buried at Steeple Aston in the family mausoleum constructed on the ruins of a chapel next to the parish church. The Flemish sculptor Henry Scheemakers created a grandiose monument to Page's specifications, which destroyed at least one of the existing tombs when it was erected. Most his estate, including a house in ‘Bedford Row’ and a manor at Lechlade, Gloucestershire, was left to his great-nephew Francis Bourne on condition that he changed his name to Page.

Parliament of Great Britain
| Preceded by John Pedley; Sir Edward Wortley Montagu | Member of Parliament for Huntingdon; 1708–1713; With: Sir Edward Wortley Montagu | Succeeded by Viscount Hinchingbrooke; Sidney Wortley-Montagu |
