= John Potenger =

English legal official and author (1647–1733)

John Potenger or Pottinger (1647–1733) was an English legal official and author. He was educated at Winchester School and Corpus Christi College, Oxford, and proceeded B.A. in 1668. He was admitted to the Inner Temple in 1675. He obtained the post of master in chancery after 1678, and subsequently sold it. He was removed from public office for refusing to support the religious policy of James II, but was restored by William III. He was the author of A Pastoral Reflection on Death, several translations, and many unpublished poems.

== Life ==
John Potenger, born on 21 July 1647, was the son of John Potenger, D.D., originally of Burghfield in Berkshire, and Anne, daughter of William Wither of Manydown in the parish of Wootton St Lawrence in Hampshire. His father was headmaster of Winchester College from 1 August 1642 to 1652, and died in 1659. Potenger was admitted to Winchester College in 1658, and matriculated at Corpus Christi College, Oxford, on 26 May 1664, where he obtained a Hampshire scholarship. He took the degree of B.A. on 1 February 1667 or 1668, and was admitted to the Inner Temple in 1675. By the favour of Sir John Ernley, then chancellor of the exchequer, he was allowed to buy at the price of 1,700l. the office of comptroller of the pipe, and was sworn in in Hilary term 1676. On 2 July 1678 he married Philadelphia, second daughter of Sir John Ernley. Subsequently he obtained the post of master in chancery, but sold it again for 700l. In the reign of James II he was removed from the commission of the peace for Middlesex for refusing to support the king's religious policy, but was restored again by William III. He died in 1733, his wife in 1692, and both were buried in the church of Broad Blunsdon in the parish of Highworth, Wiltshire.

== Works ==
Potenger was the author of A Pastoral Reflection on Death, 1691, and of many unpublished poems and translations. Two verse translations appeared anonymously: the passage on Sleep from the Silvae of Statius (v. 4) in Nahum Tate's miscellany, and an ode of Horace (ii. 14) in Dryden's second poetical miscellany. Nichols, in his Select Collection of Poems, prints Potenger's version of Horace, and adds in a note two letters from Dr. South praising his other compositions. Both translations appear in The Oxford Book of Classical Verse in Translation (1995). Potenger also published a translation of the Life of Agricola by Tacitus (8vo, 1698). His memoirs of his own life were edited in 1841 by his descendant, C. W. Bingham, vicar of Sydling St. Nicholas, Dorset. Apart from their biographical detail they contain information on the state of education at Winchester and Oxford in the seventeenth century. Extracts from the part relating to Oxford are reprinted in Couch's Reminiscences of Oxford.

== Sources ==
- Chester, Joseph Lemuel; Dean, John Ward (1887). London Marriage Licences, 1521–1869. Foster, Joseph (ed.). London: Bernard Quaritch. p. 1079.
- Dryden, John (1685). Sylvæ, or, The Second Part of Poetical Miscellanies. London: Printed for Jacob Tonson. pp. 166–168.
- Firth, C. H.; Chahoud, Anna (2004). "Potenger, John (1647–1733), legal official and writer". Oxford Dictionary of National Biography (online ed.). Oxford University Press. doi:10.1093/ref:odnb/22602. (Subscription, Wikipedia Library access or UK public library membership required.)
- Foster, Joseph (1891). Alumni Oxonienses 1500–1714. 1st series. Oxford: Parker & Co. p. 1187.
- Kirby, Thomas Frederick (1892). Annals of Winchester College. London: Henry Frowde; Winchester: P. and G. Wells. pp. 318, 345.
- Nichols, John (1780). A Select Collection of Poems. Vol. 1. London: J. Nichols. pp. 213–214.
- Nichols, John (1784). A Select Collection of Poems. Vol. 8. London: J. Nichols. pp. 286–287.
- Poole, Adrian; Maule, Jeremy (1995). The Oxford Book of Classical Verse in Translation. Oxford: Oxford University Press. pp. 323–324, 435–436, 567, 574, 581.
- Potenger, John (1841). The Private Memoirs of John Potenger, Esq. Binham, C. W. (ed.). London: Hamilton Adams and Co. p. 50.
- Quiller Couch, Lilian M. (1892). Reminiscences of Oxford by Oxford Men 1559–1850. (Oxford Historical Society). Oxford: Clarendon Press. pp. 53–56.
- Tate, Nahum (1685). Poems by Several Hands. London: Printed for J. Hindmarsh. p. 54.
- Wood, Anthony A. (1692). Athenæ Oxonienses; To which are added, The Fasti. Vol. 2. London: Printed by Tho. Bennet. pp. 739, 801.
- "Potenger, John, 1647–1733". The Online Books Page. Retrieved 30 December 2022.

Attribution:

- This article incorporates text from a publication now in the public domain: Firth, Charles Harding (1896). "Potenger, John". In Lee, Sidney (ed.). Dictionary of National Biography. Vol. 46. London: Smith, Elder & Co. pp. 206–207.
