= Laurent Delvaux =

Flemish sculptor

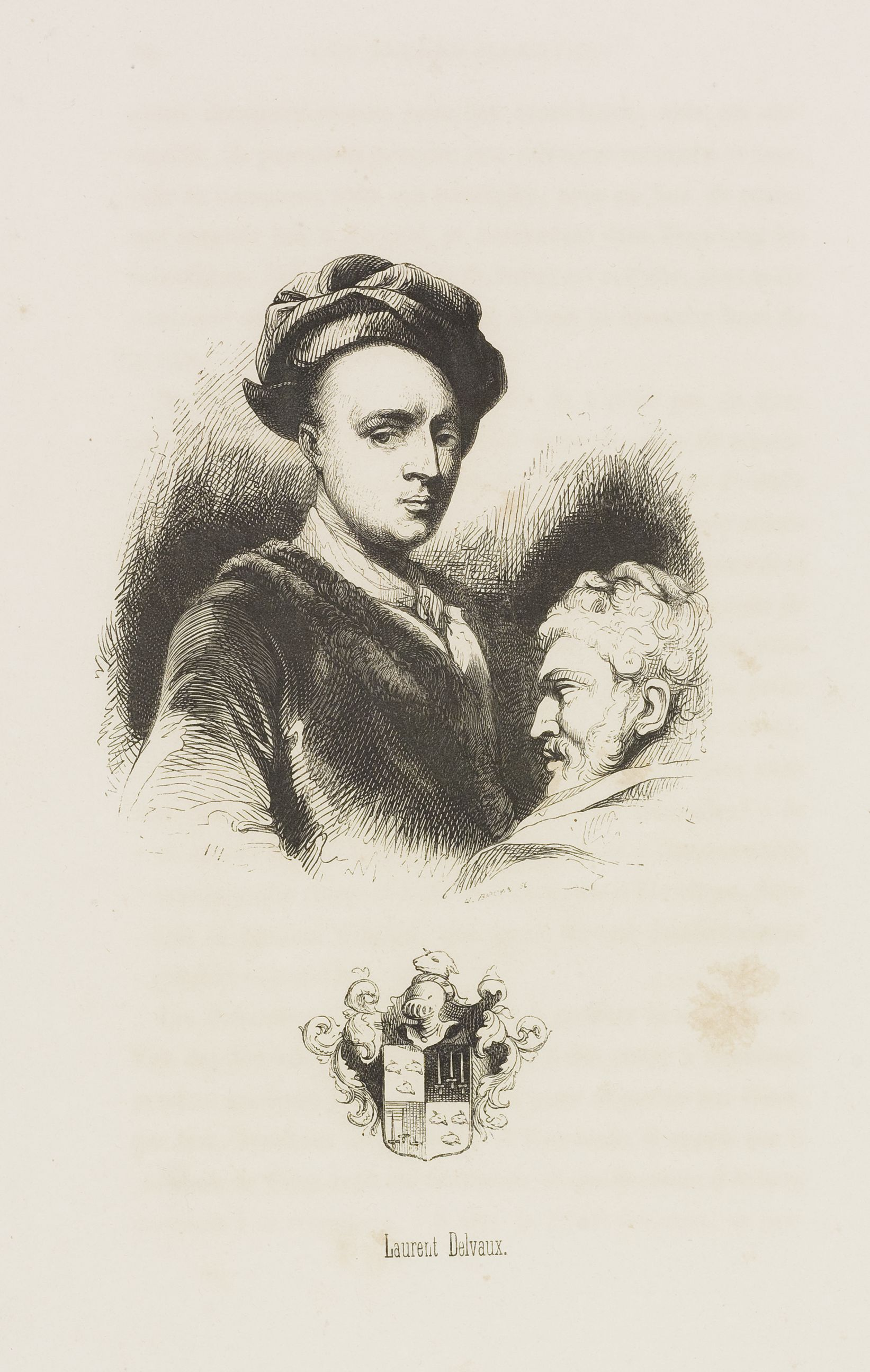
Robert Delvaux

Laurent Delvaux (1696, in Ghent – 24 February 1778, in Nivelles) was a Flemish sculptor. After a successful international career that brought him to London and Rome, he returned to the Austrian Netherlands where he was a sculptor to the court. Delvaux was a transitional figure between the Baroque and Neo-classicism.

== Life ==
=== Training ===
Delvaux probably trained in his native Ghent under the local sculptor J. B. van Helderberghe. At the age of 18 he went to Brussels to study under Pierre-Denis Plumier from Antwerp and attended the local drawing academy.

=== London ===
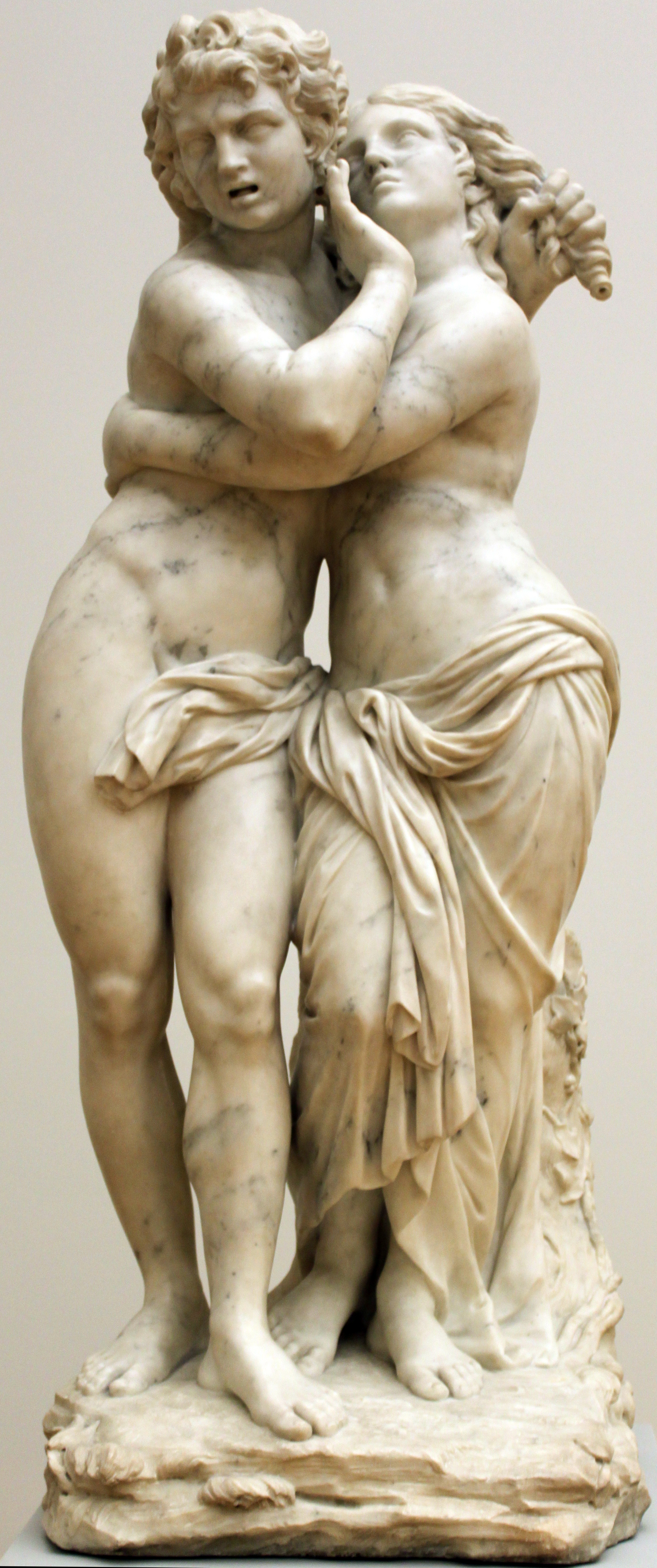
Caunus and Byblis, after 1733, Berlin, Bode-Museum

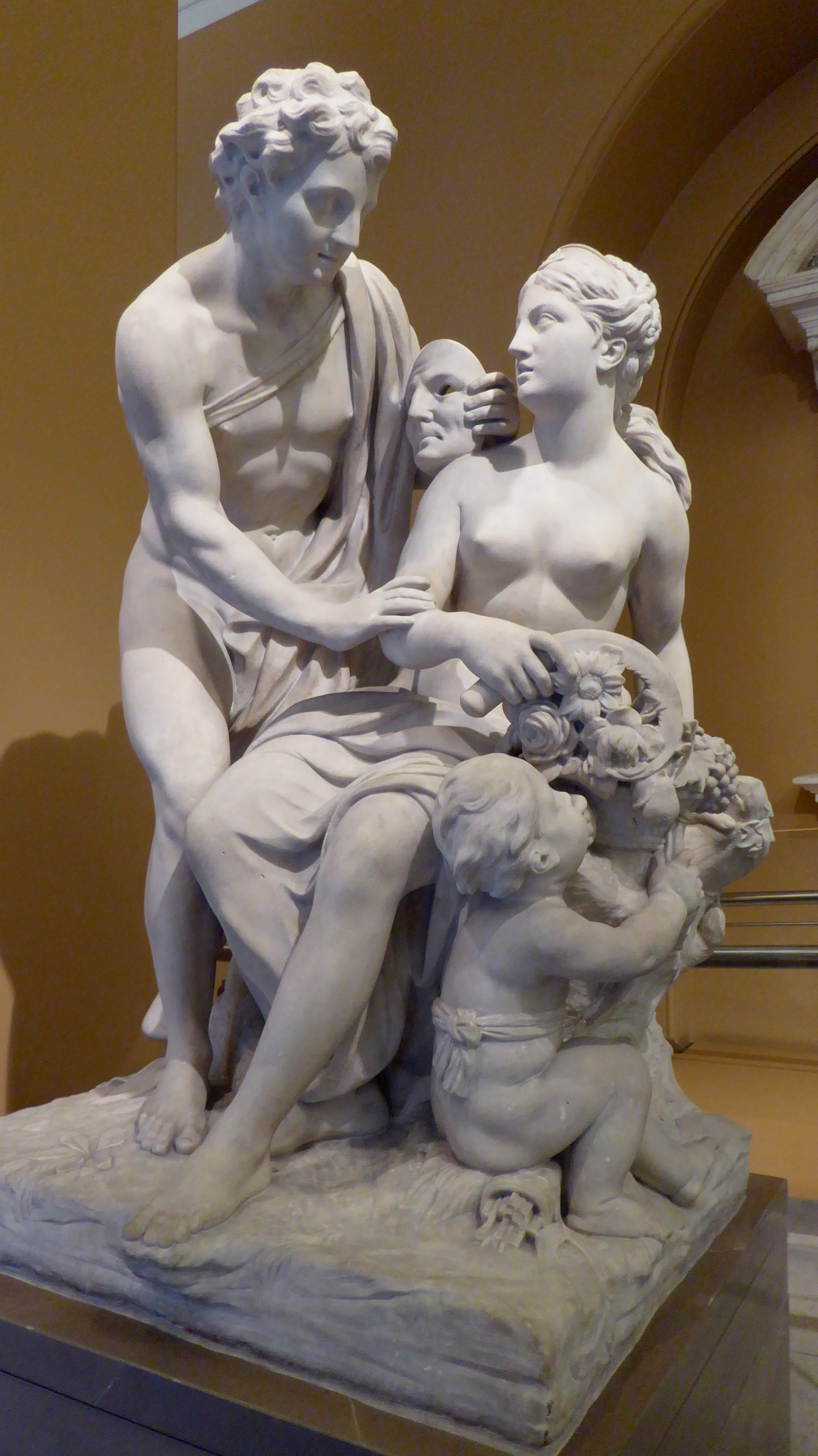
Vertumnus and Pomona

He went to London in 1717 where he collaborated with his compatriot Peter Scheemakers. When they were joined by Plumier in 1721 they worked together on a number of marble funerary monuments, including that of John Sheffield, duke of Buckingham (1721–22, London, Westminster Abbey)<Alain Jacobs, Laurent Delvaux, Gand, 1696 - Nivelles, 1778, Paris, Athena, 1999, pp. 23–27, 220-246>. After Plumier died soon after his arrival in 1721, Delvaux and Scheemakers are believed to have collaborated with Francis Bird on the marble monument to John Holles, 1st Duke of Newcastle, also in Westminster Abbey. Scheemakers and Delvaux entered into a formal partnership and set up a workshop in Millbank, Westminster, in 1723. Their workshop produced many sober classical monuments and garden statuary after the Antique. The partners sold their stock in the partnership and travelled to Rome in 1728.

=== Rome ===
In Rome [Jacobs 1999, pp. 28–32, 246-268], Delvaux studied the work of compatriots Giambologna and François Duquesnoy as well as Italian sculpture of the 17th century and of his contemporaries. He keenly admired the sculpture of Classical antiquity and took the opportunity to copy newly discovered pieces. While in Rome, John Russell, 4th Duke of Bedford, commissioned a number of works inspired by antique examples, most notably Caunus and Byblis. This group is a free version of a sculpture by Pierre Le Gros the Younger of some 20 or so years earlier where Le Gros had deliberately added heads, hands and legs to a fragmented antique group of Amor and Psyche in such a way that it turned the love story on its head and instead of Amor showed Caunus as he vehemently defends himself against the sexual advances of his sister.

=== Return to the Austrian Netherlands ===
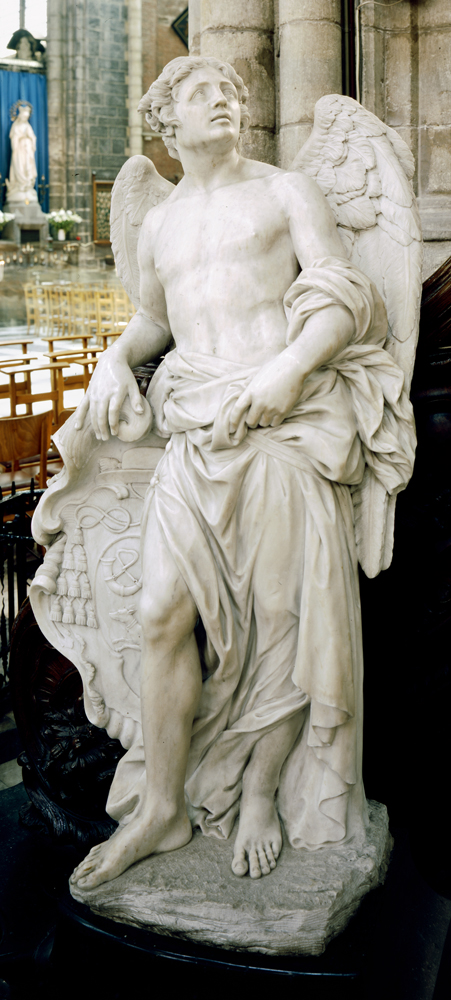
Detail of pulpit in the Saint Bavo Cathedral in Ghent

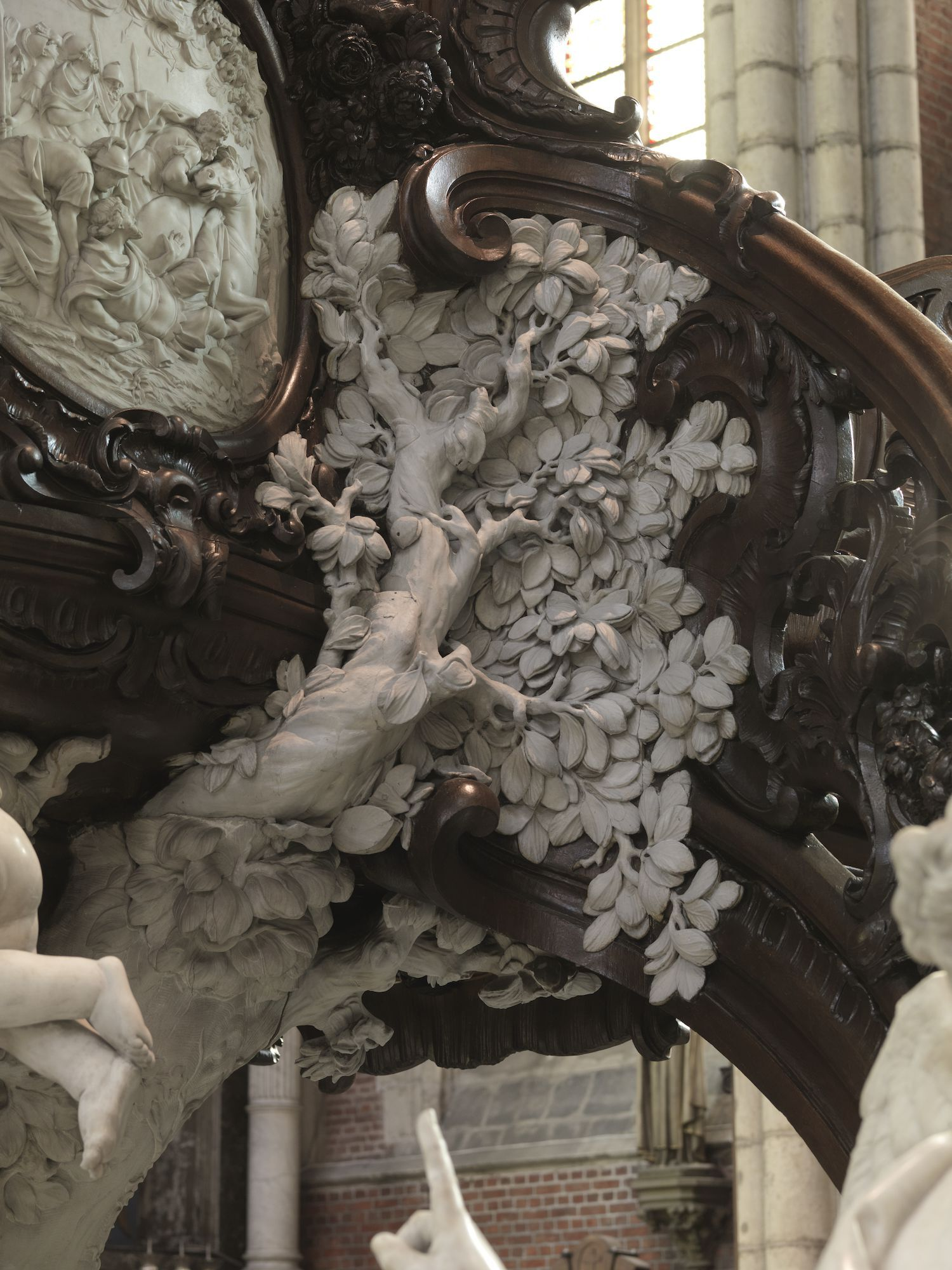
Pulpit in the Saint Bavo Cathedral Ghent

Upon his return to the Austrian Netherlands in 1733 [see Jacobs 1999, passim], he became a court sculptor. He also received many religious commissions including the oak group of the Conversion of St Paul dated 1736 (now in the Collegiate Church of St Gertrude in Nivelles). The same church also holds a series of oak statues of the Apostles sculpted by Delvaux in 1743–4. He also made a marble funerary monument for the Van der Noot family in 1746– for the Carmelite Church in Brussels and which is now in the Rijksmuseum.

After Prince Charles de Lorraine arrived in Brussels as the governor general of the Austrian Netherlands in 1741, Delvaux received many commissions for the decoration of the governor general's residences in Brussels, Tervuren (near Brussels) and Mariemont, Belgium in Hainaut[Jacobs 1999]. For the palace in Brussels, which survives partially, he created allegorical reliefs for the façade and the staircase and free-standing statues, including a marble Hercules at the foot of the stairs. Delvaux also worked for other European courts such as that of Portugal and for major abbeys like those at Afflighem, Floreffe and Villers. In 1734 he settled in Nivelles.

In addition to monumental work, Delvaux created many excellent models in terracotta.

Many Belgian churches and museums in Brussels, Nivelles and Ghent hold works by him.

== Pupils ==
Among Delvaux's students were the sculptors Gilles-Lambert Godecharle, Pierre-François Le Roy, Laurent Joseph Tamine, Adrien-Joseph Anrion and Joseph Wilton. Delvaux's grandson Édouard Delvaux (1806-1862) was a rural painter and a student of Henri Van Assche (1774-1841).

== Bibliography ==
- Alain Jacobs, Laurent Delvaux, Gand, 1696 - Nivelles, 1778, Paris, Athena, 1999
- Alain Jacobs, Addenda au catalogue raisonné de Laurent Delvaux, Annales Société royale d'Archéologie d'Histoire et de Folklore de Nivelles, XXXIII, 2016, pp. 17–59.
