= HMS Exeter (1680) =

Ship of the line of the Royal Navy

History

England
- Name: HMS Exeter
- Ordered: 20 February 1678
- Builder: Sir Henry Johnson of Blackwall
- Launched: March 1680
- Commissioned: 8 June 1679
- Reclassified: Hulked at Portsmouth, 1691
- Fate: Accidentally burnt at Plymouth, Broken at Portsmouth in 1717

General characteristics as built
- Class & type: 70-gun third rate ship of the line
- Tons burthen: 1,03188/94 tons (bm)
- Length: 150 ft 2 in (45.77 m) gundeck; 120 ft 0 in (36.58 m) keel for tonnage
- Beam: 40 ft 2.5 in (12.26 m)
- Draught: 18 ft 0 in (5.49 m)
- Depth of hold: 16 ft 9.5 in (5.12 m)
- Propulsion: Sails
- Sail plan: Full-rigged ship
- Armament: 1677 Establishment 70/62 guns; 26 × demi-cannons 54 cwt – 9.5 ft (LD); 26 × 12-pdr guns 32 cwt – 9 ft (UD); 10 × sakers 16 cwt – 7 ft (QD); 4 × sakers 16 cwt – 7 ft (Fc); 5 × 5 3-pdr guns 5 cwt – 5 ft (RH)

HMS Exeter was a 70-gun third rate ship of the line of the Kingdom of England, built by contract Sir Henry Johnson at Blackwall under the 1677 Construction Programme. She was at the Battle of Beachy Head in 1690. She was accidentally burnt at Plymouth in 1691. Her remains were hulked at Portsmouth until she was broken in 1717.

She was the first vessel to bear the name Exeter in the English and Royal Navy.

== Construction and specifications ==
She was ordered on 20 February 1678 to be built under contract by Sir Henry Johnson of Blackwall on the River Thames. She was launched in March 1680. Her dimensions were a gundeck of 150 feet 2 inches (45.77 metres) with a keel of 120 feet 0 inches (36.58 metres) for tonnage calculation with a breadth of 40 feet 2.5 inches (12.26 metres) and a depth of hold of 16 feet 9.5 inches (5.12 metres). Her builder's measure tonnage was calculated as 1,03188/94 tons burthen. Her draught was 18 feet 0 inches (5.49 metres).

Her initial gun armament was in accordance with the 1677 Establishment with 72/60 guns consisting of twenty-six demi-cannons (54 cwt, 9.5 ft) on the lower deck, twenty-six 12-pounder guns (32 cwt, 9 ft) on the upper deck, ten sakers (16 cwt, 7 ft) on the quarterdeck and four sakers (16 cwt, 7 ft) on the foc's'le with four 3-pounder guns (5 cwt, 5 ft) on the poop deck or roundhouse. By 1688 she would carry 70 guns as per the 1685 Establishment . Her initial manning establishment would be for a crew of 460/380/300 personnel.

== Commissioned service ==
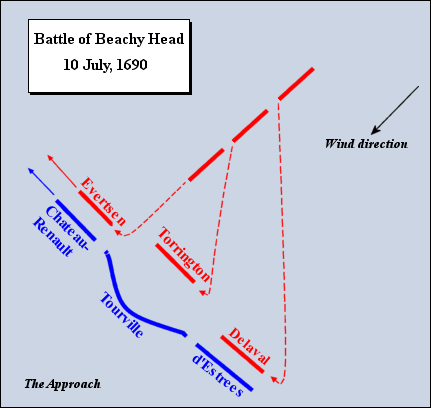
Beachy Head, 10 July 1690: Exeter and the blue squadron (rear) were opposed to d'Estrees' French rear

HMS Exeter was commissioned on 8 June 1679 under the command of Captain John Perryman for delivery to Chatham. In 1689 she was under the command of Captain Lawrence Wright followed by Captain Mathew Tennant. Under Captain George Mees in 1690. She fought in the Battle of Beachy Head in Rear (Blue) Squadron on 30 June 1690.

== Loss ==
She was burnt by accident at Plymouth on 12 September 1691. Her remains were hulked at Portsmouth until she was broken in 1717.
