= Thomas Scheemakers =

English sculptor

Thomas Scheemakers (c. 1740 – 15 July 1808), or Thomas Scheemaeckers according to his own signature, was a sculptor in late 18th-century London. He was the last of the Scheemaeckers family of sculptors originally from Antwerp. Several of his works are held by the Victoria and Albert Museum and can be found in parish churches around England.

== Life ==
Thomas was born Thomas-Henry Scheemaeckers, son of sculptor Henry Scheemakers of London then Paris, nephew of sculptor Peter Scheemakers The Younger (1691-1781) of London, and grandson of sculptor Pieter Scheemaeckers of Antwerp.

Parents, Birth and Baptism

Based on the inscription in St Pancras churchyard where he was later buried, giving his age in 1808 as 68 years, Thomas-Henry was born around 1740, and therefore was born in Paris, probably at his parents' home on the rue Meslay.

Thomas-Henry's father Henry Scheemakers (c.1686-1748) had been born in Flanders to the Antwerp sculptor Pieter Scheemaeckers and his wife Catharine van der Hulst. Henry may have worked as a journeyman in Copenhagen for Johann Adam Sturmberg, before settling in Westminster in the early 1720s. He was certainly in London by 1726, in which year Henry Scheemakers, Statuary, is recorded as taking as apprentice John van Nost.

The following year 1727, Henry Scheemakers married Catherine Hennekin in the Royal Catholic Chapel in St James's Westminster. Catherine was the daughter of Flemish-born Michiel (Michael) Hennekin, who had been apprenticed to the great sculptor Jan Claudius de Cock in 1697, although he appears to have been a London printseller by the time of his death in 1725; Catherine’s brother Simon was a carver and gilder, as was Simon's son George Michael Hennekin.

Unfortunately the baptisms of Henry and Catherine's children born from 1728 onwards, including that of Thomas-Henry, have not yet been found, probably because the elder children were baptised privately and quietly at one of the Catholic Legation or Embassy Chapels in London, and very few of these records survive from before 1744. The younger children were born in Paris, but the agitations of 1870 led to the loss of the Paris baptism registers amongst others, so again the baptisms cannot be found. However, we do know the children's names : Thomas' brother Michael (named after their grandfather Michael Hennekin) and sister Catherine both died young and were buried at St Margaret's Westminster in 1731 and September 1734 respectively. Thomas and his three surviving siblings were named as their father's heirs in Paris after Henry died there in July 1748 : Peter, Thomas-Henry, Marie-Louise, and Geneviève-Catherine.

It was therefore Henry and Catherine Scheemakers who were Thomas Scheemakers' parents, not his uncle Peter Scheemakers the Younger as has been claimed. Indeed Peter, although married, died without issue.

Apprenticeship, Training and London

Thomas-Henry's sculptor father had died when he was only around 8 years old, and no apprenticeship record has yet been found, so we do not know whether Thomas was apprenticed to a sculptor at home in Paris, or whether he came directly to uncle Peter in London for his training. All we can say is that at some point before 1763, Thomas-Henry came to London to join his distinguished and successful uncle Peter Scheemakers the Younger, who was married but childless (and whose wife Barbara La Fosse died in London in 1768). In the 1760s Thomas probably worked together with Peter on several of his uncle's larger pieces, particularly after Peter's apprentice then journeyman, sculptor Joseph Nollekens had left England to study in Rome, where he arrived in 1762.

In the meantime, Thomas' elder brother Peter, known as Pierre Scheemackers (c.1728-1765), had also become sculptor, but back in Paris. Pierre Scheemakers was admitted to the Académie de Saint-Luc in Paris in 1755, exhibiting there at several Salons before being appointed professor at the Académie in 1764, but died the following year 1765.

Inheritance from uncle Peter Scheemakers

Uncle Peter Scheemakers retired aged 80 in 1771, and returned to live with his siblings Elisabeth and Francis in his native city of Antwerp, where he died ten years later in September 1781 age 90. From his Will, Peter did not leave his London property to Thomas as has been hitherto assumed, not only because Thomas was simply not his son, but also (as was customary in Flanders for a childless widower), Peter left his estate to be divided equally between his surviving siblings or, if deceased, their share to be divided amongst their children. Thus Thomas and his two sisters were entitled to one-third each of their deceased father Henry's quarter of Peter's estate, giving Thomas just 1/12th of uncle Peter's estate. (This contradicts allegations previously on this page, both that Thomas was Peter's sole heir, and that he subsequently "squandered" his supposed inherited "fortune").

London Premises and Addresses

Thomas must have retained a link to his uncle's Vine Street workshop, as at his own death he is recorded in Bank of England records as "Thomas Scheemaekers of Vine Street, Statuary". However by then he had long been resident in Great Titchfield Street in Marylebone, starting 1782 - the year following his uncle's death in Antwerp - and it is Great Titchfield Street that was on Thomas' burial inscription. As Thomas made no mention of property ownership in his own Will written in 1787, it is likely that he had simply leased the Vine Street premises for sculptural work, which explains why he never figures as a Vine Street ratepayer in the St James' Westminster Rate Books, but does figure yearly as a resident in the Marylebone parish Land Tax Records from 1782 until his death.

Marriage

Although born to Catholic parents and baptised Catholic, Thomas Scheemakers married Barbara Row or Rowe at the Anglican parish church of St Mary Marylebone on 21 April 1779, their witnesses were Joseph and Maria Leoni, but, like his uncle before him, Thomas and Barbara had no children.

Later Life

Thomas Scheemakers seems to have ceased working as a monumental sculptor after 1792, but continued to exhibit yearly at the Royal Academy from 1780 until 1804, selling his sculpture-related effects in 1805. This sale has been used to allege that he was bankrupt, but as no proceedings are recorded in the London Gazette as would be legally required, this is highly unlikely, and the 1805 sale was much more likely and simply Thomas' 'retirement sale'.

Will

Thomas drew up his Will - which he signed in his own hand as "Thomas Scheemaeckers" - unusually early by 18th century custom, in 1787, 19 years before he died. When he died, he left his widow comfortably off, with an estate valued at just under £3,500, of which £3,100 invested in the Bank of England. Executors were his wife Barbara, sculptor Joseph Nollekens (who had previously been apprenticed to and worked for his uncle Peter, and stayed in touch after Peter died), and one Thomas Lewis, connection unknown.

Burial

Thomas Scheemakers was buried on 18 July 1808 in the churchyard of St Pancras Old Church and was followed by his wife Barbara Row in January 1810, who had in the meantime moved to Fitzroy Square. Now lost, their inscription in Old St Pancras Churchyard once read:

- To the Memory of /
- Thomas SHEEMAKERS, Esq^{r}., /
- formerly of /
- Great Titchfield Street, /
- in the Parish of St.Marylebone, /
- Statuary, /
- who died 15 July 1808, /
- aged 68 years. /
- Also Mrs. BARBARA SHEEMAKERS, /
- Relict of the above, /
- Who departed this Life, 11th Jan^{y} /
- 1810, aged 63 years. /
- Requiescant in pace.

Posterity

After Barbara's death, Joseph Nollekens as second executor did indeed act to clear the estate as Thomas had requested. Thomas' estate, including those Bank of England funds, was split equally between his surviving sister Geneviève-Catherine Scheemaekers (who died in Antwerp in 1819), and the descendants of his deceased brother Pierre, the Paris-based sculptor, that is, Thomas' niece Marie-Julie Scheemackers. However by this time Marie-Julie too had died, so her portion was shared amongst her three children with the surname Dubourg, now the only descendants of those five Scheemaekers sculptors whose lives had stretched from 1640 to 1808: Peter, his two sons Henry and Peter the younger, and Henry's two sons Pierre and Thomas.

== Works ==
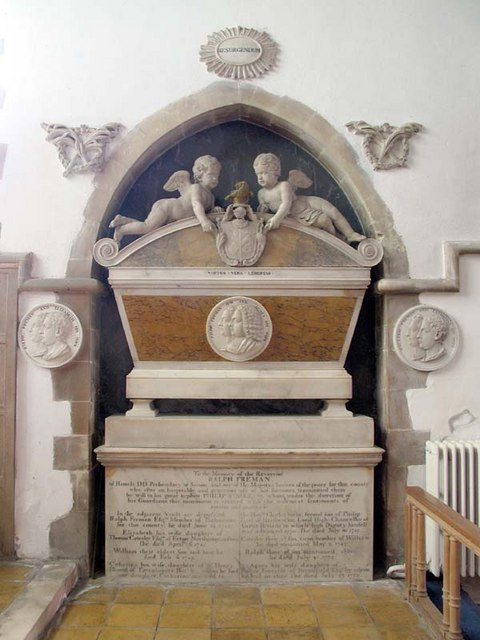
Freeman monument at St Mary's, Braughing, Herts

- Monument to Sir Jemmet Raymond, Kintbury Church, Berkshire (1772)
- Monument to Dr Ralph Freeman, Braughing Church (1773)
- Monuments to Joseph Cockes and Mary Cockes, Eastnor Church, Herefordshire (1779)
- Monument to Thomas Bentley, Chiswick Church, London (1780, erected by his business partner, Josiah Wedgwood) wrongly attributed to his deceased uncle in many sources
- Monument to Anthony Duncombe, 1st Baron Feversham, Downton Church, Wiltshire (1784)
- Monument to Mrs Mary Russell, Powick Church, Worcestershire (1786) (his masterpiece according to Pevsner)
- Monument to Thomas and Catherine Wilson, Holy Trinity Church Bungay, Suffolk
- Monument to Sir John Honeywood who died 1781, St James's Church Elmsted, Kent
- Statue of a horse being attacked by a lion, Rousham House, Oxfordshire
