= HMS Union =

Eight ships of the Royal Navy have borne the name HMS Union:

- HMS Union (1693) was a fifth rate of unknown origin, possibly a hired vessel. She was burnt in 1693 to avoid being captured by the French.
- HMS Union was a 90-gun second rate, previously named HMS Albemarle. She was renamed HMS Union in 1709, was rebuilt in 1726 and broken up in 1749.
- HMS Union (1756) was a 90-gun second rate launched in 1756. She was converted into a hospital ship in 1799 and was renamed HMS Sussex in 1802. She was broken up in 1816.
- HMS Union (1794) was a 3-gun gunvessel purchased in 1794 and listed until 1798.
- HMS Union (1806) was a cutter in service in 1806 and broken up in 1810.
- HMS Union (1811) was a 98-gun second rate launched in 1811 and broken up in 1833.
- HMS Union (1823) was the mercantile City of Kingston that the Navy purchased in 1823 for service as a 3-gun schooner; she was wrecked in 1828.
- HMS Union (N56) was a U-class submarine launched in 1940 and sunk in 1941.
