= Pierre-Denis Plumier =

Flemish sculptor

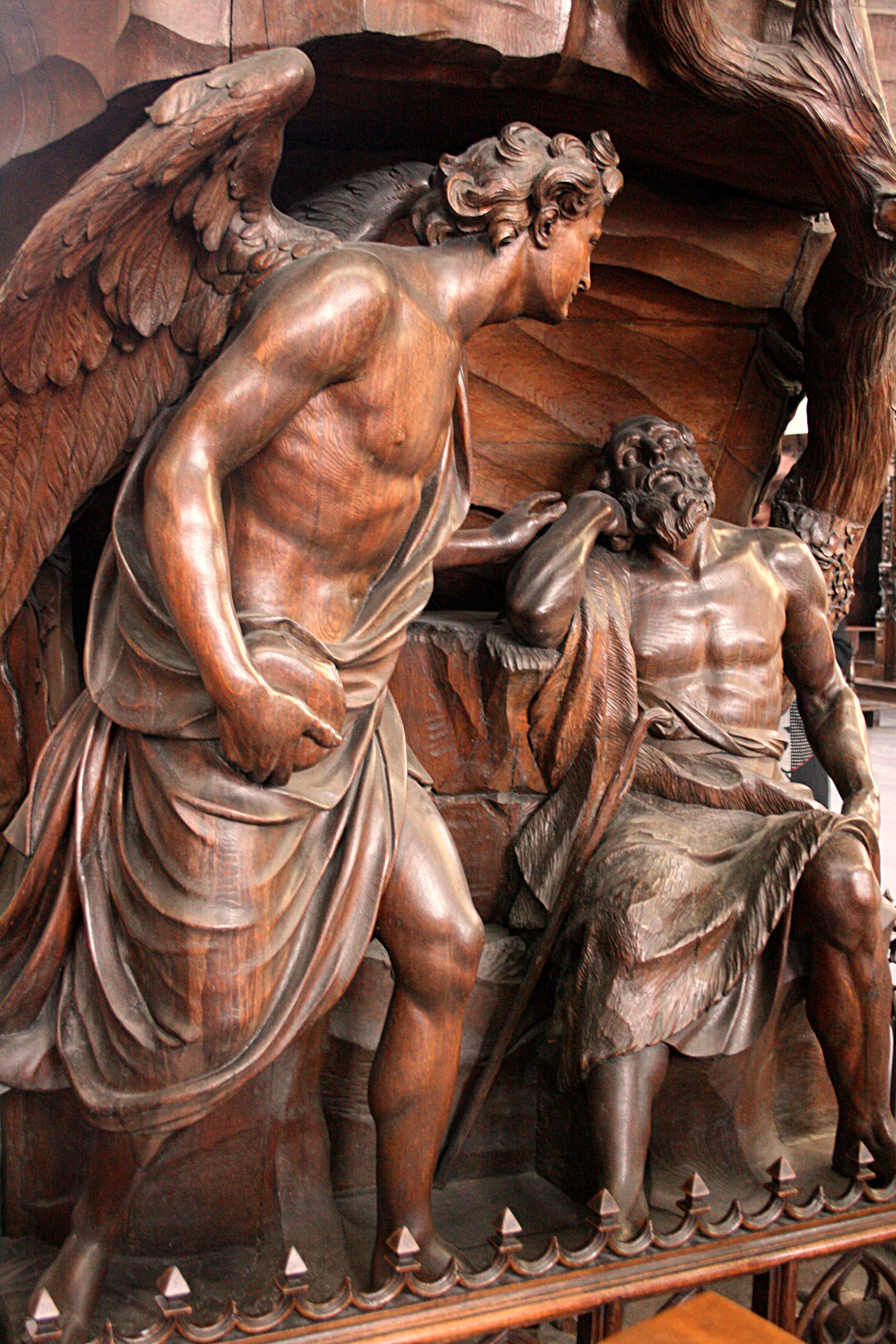
Pulpit (detail), Chapel Church of Brussels

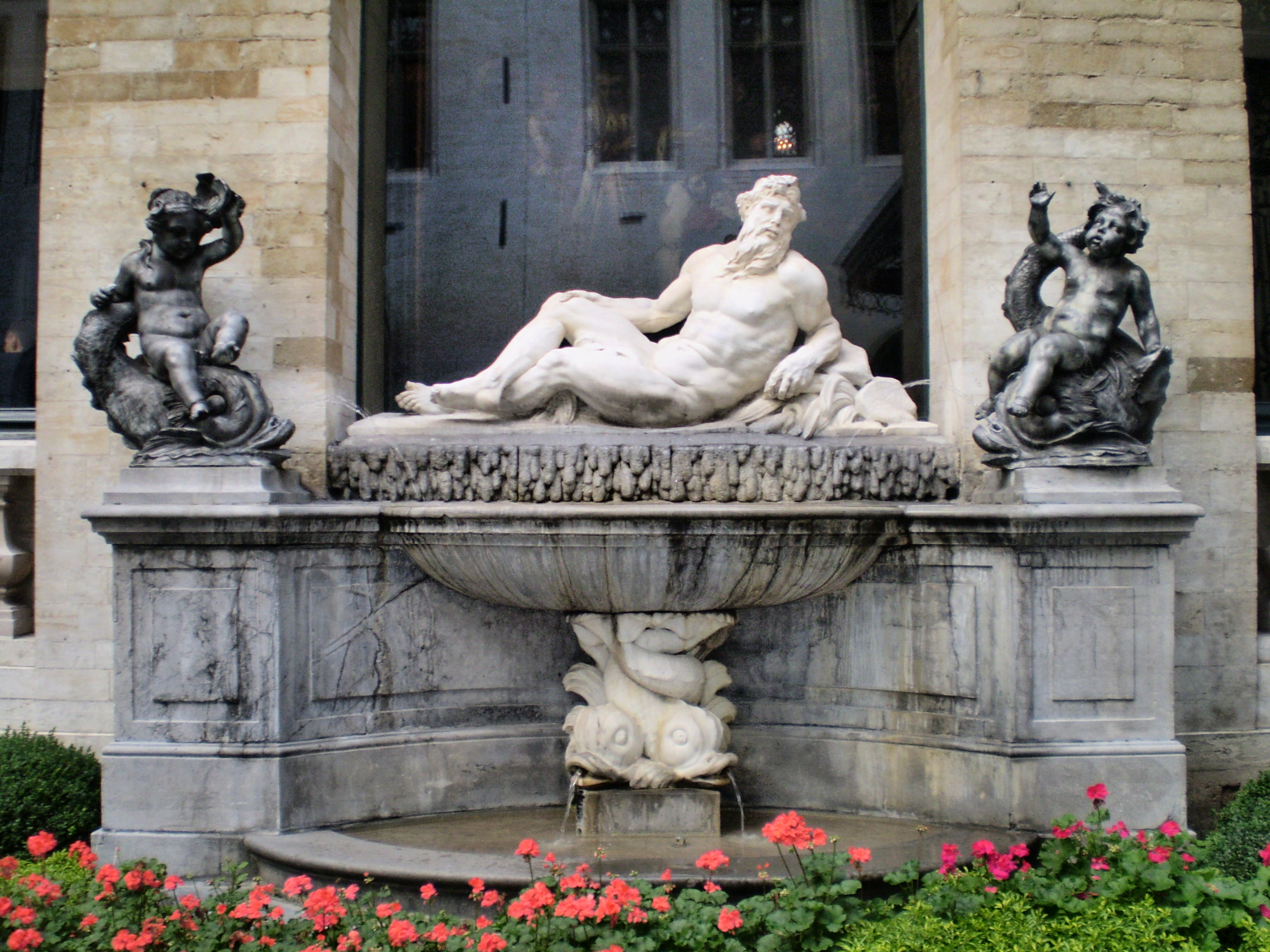
De Schelde, Brussels Town Hall

Pierre-Denis Plumier (4 March 1688 – 24 February 1721) was a Flemish sculptor.

== Biography ==
Plumier was born in Antwerp in 1688, the son of Franciscus Puymier and Anna Schobbens. In 1699 he was apprenticed to the sculptor Louis Willemsen in Antwerp. Between 1700 and 1713 he lived first in Paris, where in 1708 he was awarded the first prize of the Académie Royale de Peinture et de Sculpture, and then in Rome. In 1713 he returned to Brussels, where his first commission was a portrait bust of Goswin de Wynants. In the same year he made two marble works for the Marquis de Mérode-Westerlo for the castle of Enghien in the province of Hainaut: Enlèvement de Proserpine and Enlèvement des Sabines. Both works are now in the Egmont Palace of Brussels.

Plumier's work is considered part of the Brussels School. Two well-known pupils of his were Laurent Delvaux and Theodoor Verhaegen. In 1721 Plumier, followed by Delvaux, went to London where he died a short time later, at the age of 33. He acquired a commission for a funerary monument in Westminster Abbey for John Sheffield, 1st Duke of Buckingham on which he collaborated with his pupil Delvaux and Peter Scheemakers. Plumier is buried in the cemetery of the London borough of Westminster.
