= Henry Cheere =

English sculptor (1703–1781)

Sir Henry Cheere, 1st Baronet (1703 – 15 January 1781) was an English sculptor and monumental mason. He was the older brother of John Cheere, also a notable sculptor.

== Personal life and career ==
Born in Clapham, Surrey (now part of London), he was the son of Sarah and John Cheere (d.1756). Gunnis suggests he was initially apprenticed to John Nost.

Cheere was apprenticed in 1718 to mason-sculptor Robert Hartshorne, an assistant to William and Edward Stanton. By 1726 he had established his own sculptor's yard near St Margaret's, Westminster, was joined by Flemish sculptor Henry Scheemakers (from c.1729 until Scheemakers' departure from England c. 1733; Scheemakers d. 1748) and took on many apprentices.

In 1743, Cheere was appointed "Carver" to Westminster Abbey, an appointment which led to his creation of at least nine monuments in the Abbey. He purchased property in the area surrounding the Abbey and took on civic offices including acting as a director of the Westminster Fire Office (in 1745–47 and 1760–62), Controller of Duties for the Free Fish Market of Westminster (from 1749), Justice of the Peace (c. 1750) and deputy lieutenant for the county of Middlesex.

In July 1748, Cheere joined William Hogarth and other artist friends, including Thomas Hudson, Joseph and Alexander Van Aken and Francis Hayman, on a trip to Paris, and then on to Flanders and the Netherlands.

In 1750, he was appointed a Fellow of the Society of Antiquaries. He was knighted on 10 December 1760 and created a baronet, of St Margaret's, Westminster on 19 July 1766. Cheere was one of a group who unsuccessfully attempted to promote an English academy of arts (prior to the establishment of the Royal Academy).

He retired from business and sold the contents of his workshop in March 1770.

== Death and legacy ==
Upon his death, his son William Cheere succeeded him as 2nd Baronet, but died unmarried in 1808. Sir Henry also had two daughters, one of them named Charles (1735–1799).

According to the Pevsner Buildings of England series guides, Henry Cheere was "the first English-born sculptor to match the virtuosity of the continentals" and "formed his style on the small, crisp, curvaceous shapes of the French sculptor [Roubiliac], though his monuments never approached Roubiliac's in ease and inventiveness. Much of his work is unsigned, as is his commonly considered c.1760 masterpiece at Shadoxhurst, Kent.

== Works ==
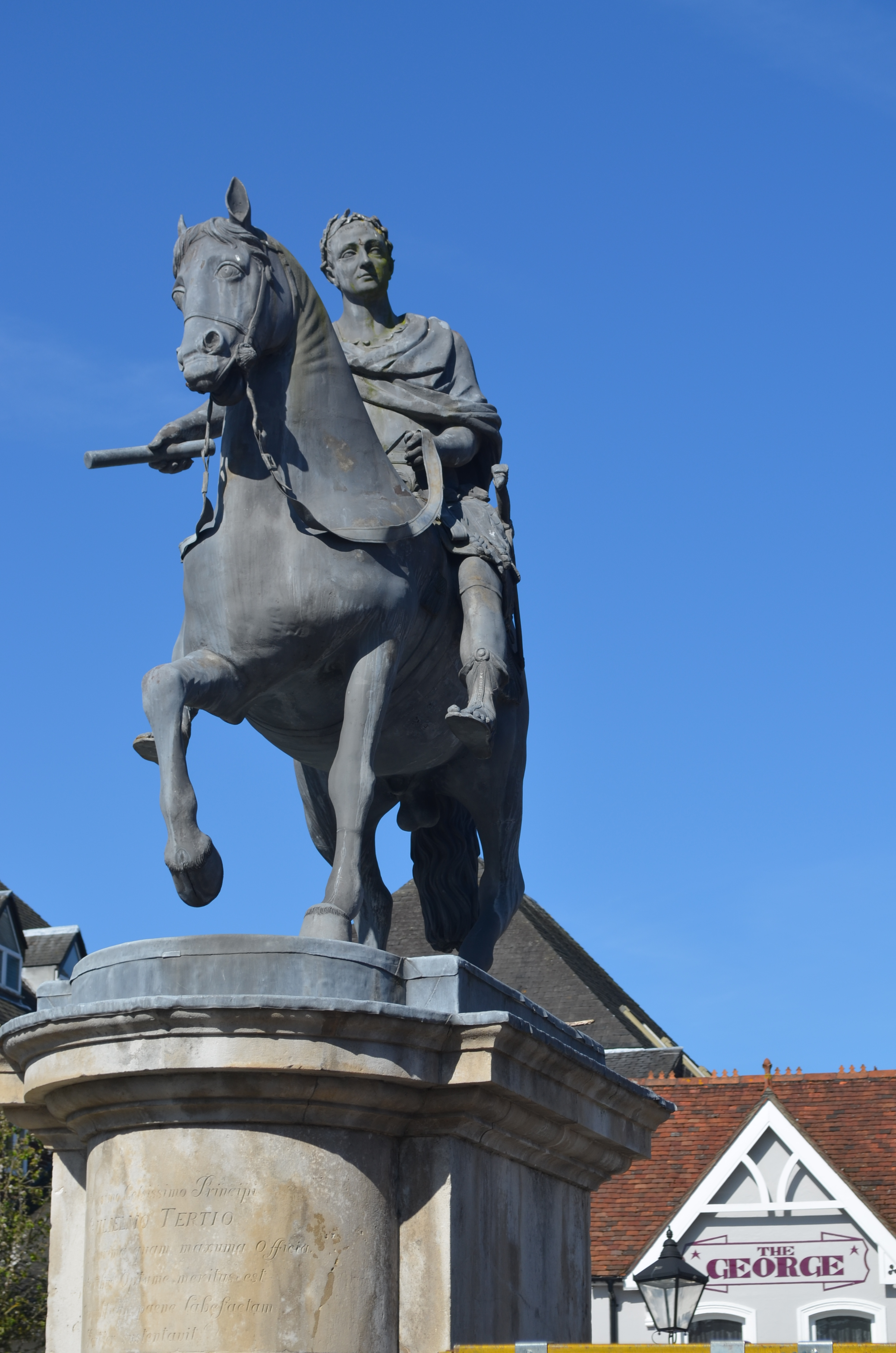
Statue of William III in Petersfield (c. 1757)

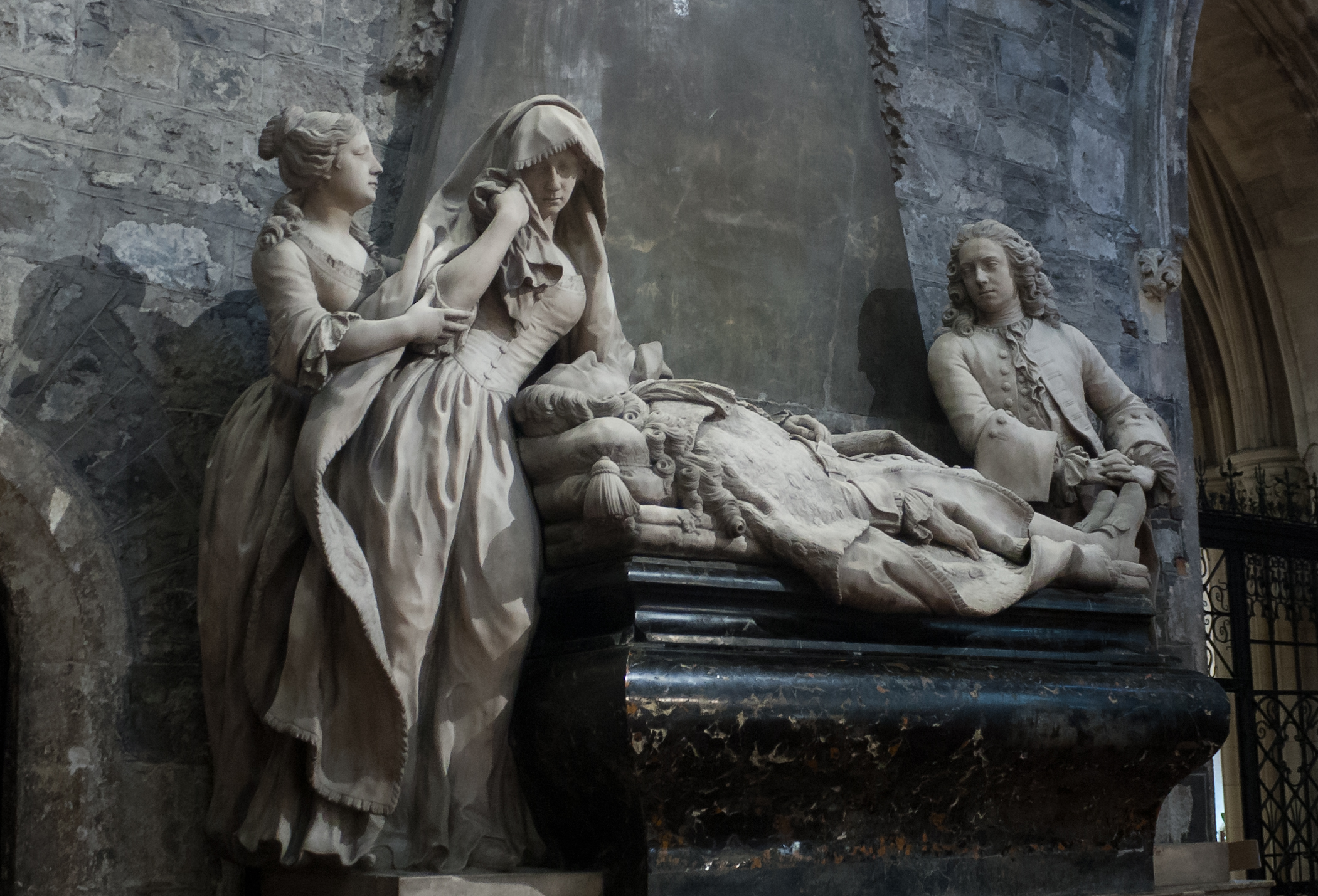
Monument dedicated to Robert FitzGerald, 19th Earl of Kildare

- Monument to Robert Bertie, 1st Duke of Ancaster and Kesteven (c. 1728; Edenham, Lincolnshire) (with Henry Scheemakers)
- Statue of Queen Caroline for The Queen's College, Oxford
- Statue of Christopher Codrington for All Souls College, Oxford
- Monument to Lord Chief Justice Raymond (d. 1732) at Abbots Langley, Hertfordshire
- Gateposts to Sausmarez Manor, Guernsey
- Memorial to Capt Philip de Sausmarez in Westminster Abbey (c. 1747)
- Monument to Admiral Sir Thomas Hardy (1666–1732) in Westminster Abbey
- Equestrian statuette of the Duke of Cumberland (c. 1746 - 1770) – in National Army Museum
- Bust of Nicholas Hawksmoor – in National Portrait Gallery
- Memorial to Sir John Brownlow, 5th Bt of Humby, Viscount Tyrconnel and Baron Charleville, in St Peter and St Paul's Church, Belton, Lincolnshire
- Monument to architect Thomas Archer, in church of St Mary, Hale, Hampshire
- Marble statue of barrister Sir George Cooke (1645–1740) of Harefield (c. 1744–1749) – in private collection
- Monument to James Cooper (d.1743) and his wife in All Saints, West Ham, Essex
- Monument to the Earl of Kildare in Christ Church Cathedral, Dublin
- Equestrian monument to King William III (c. 1757), in Petersfield, Hampshire
- Memorial to Robert Davies Esq. of Llanerch (c1736), in Parish Church of St Mary the Virgin, Mold, Flintshire
- Funerary monument to Sir Richard Newman and family (c.1747), in the parish church of St. Mary Magdalene, Fifehead Magdalen, Dorset
- Funerary monument to James Walsingham (1728) in parish church of St. Mary the Virgin, Little Chesterford, Essex
- Various gods of Greece and Rome, including Minerva in Southill Park, August and Flora for Longford Castle, and the River God for Stourhead
- Monument to the Gwyn sisters and their friend, Ann Hester Antrim, in the Church of St Mary, Great Baddow, Essex (c1753)

== Notes ==
Baronetage of Great Britain
New creation	Baronet (of St Margaret's); 1766–1781	Succeeded by William Cheere
