= Académie de Saint-Luc =

Guild of painters and sculptors in Paris (1391–1776)

The Académie de Saint-Luc (French pronunciation: [akademi də sɛ̃ lyk]; English: "Academy of Saint Luke") was a guild of painters and sculptors set up in Paris in 1391, and dissolved in 1776. It was created by the Provost of Paris, along the lines of the Guilds of Saint Luke in other parts of Europe.

In 1648, a group of artists with royal patronage, led by Charles Le Brun, successfully persuaded the court of King Louis XIV to support the creation of the Académie Royale de Peinture et de Sculpture, an art institution with different membership criteria that became a rival to the Académie de Saint-Luc.

The Académie de Saint-Luc remained successful in subsequent years by attracting artists who did not have access to the Académie Royale de Peinture et de Sculpture. This was particularly the case for women artists. In the 18th century, there were 130 female members of the Académie de Saint-Luc, many more than at the Académie Royale, which in 1783 limited its female members to four.

In the 1770s, the success of the Académie de Saint-Luc provoked the enmity of the Academie Royale, which complained to the King and petitioned for the closure of their rival. The Académie de Saint-Luc was closed in February 1776, either on the order of Louis XVI in response to the petition, or as part of the broader suppression of the guilds by the edict of Minister Anne Robert Jacques Turgot.

Some of its members later became accepted by the Académie Royale de Peinture et de Sculpture.

== Members ==
- Jean Bassange
- Henri Bonnart (Academy Rector)
- Laurent Cars
- Jean Siméon Chardin
- Joseph Ducreux
- Charles Eisen
- Nicolas Fouché
- Francois Guérin
- Alexander Kucharsky
- Jean-Baptiste Lallemand
- Alexandre Joseph Paillet
- François Perrier
- Jean-Michel Picart
- Nicolas-Jean-Baptiste Raguenet
- Gabriel de Saint-Aubin
- Pierre Scheemackers (Professor, from January 1764)
- Sébastien Slodtz
- Claude Joseph Vernet
- Guillaume Voiriot
- Élisabeth Vigée Le Brun
- Adélaïde Labille-Guiard
