= Musée Antoine Vivenel =

French museum

Coordinates: 49.4176°N 2.8213°E

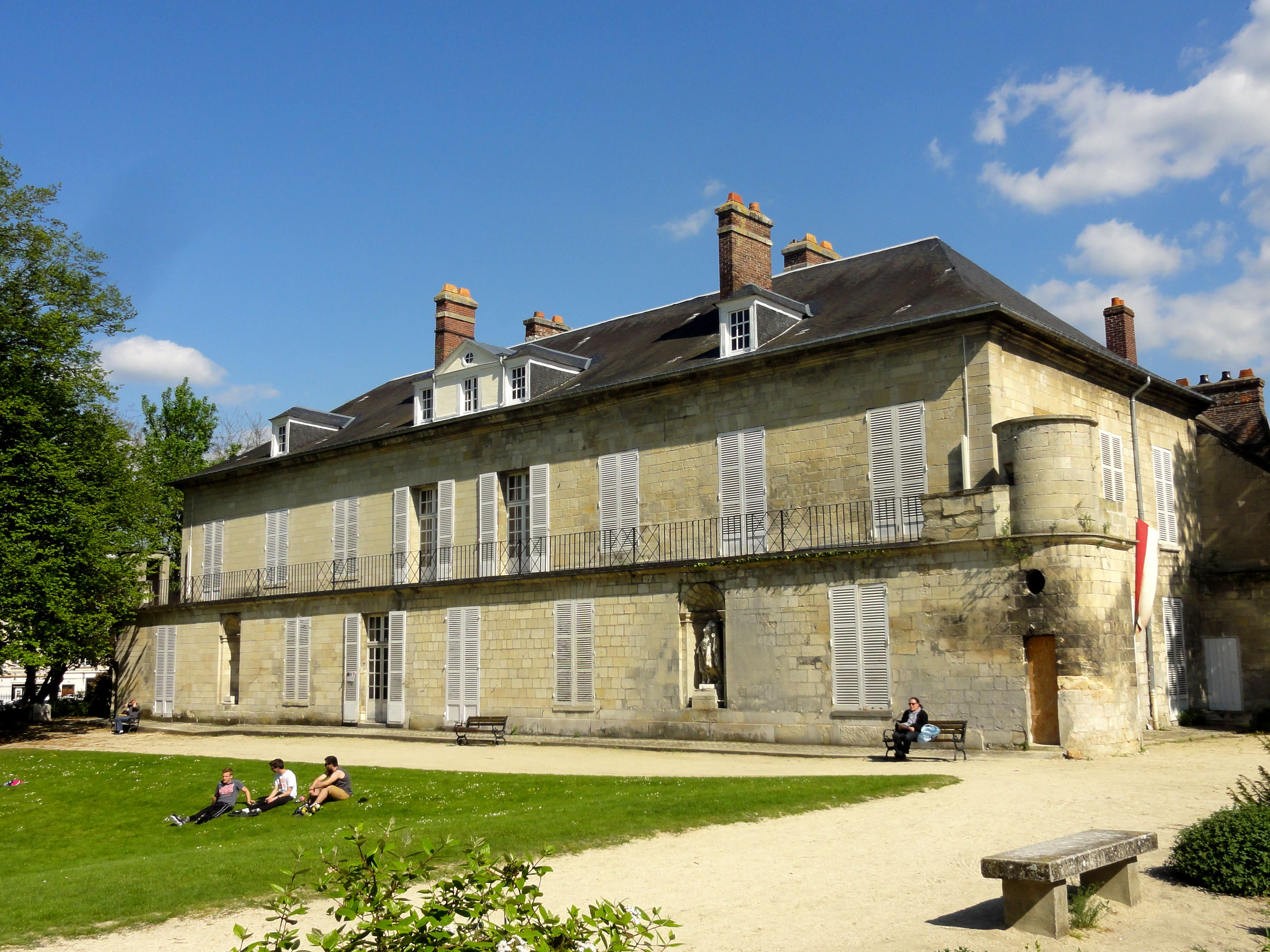
Rear facade

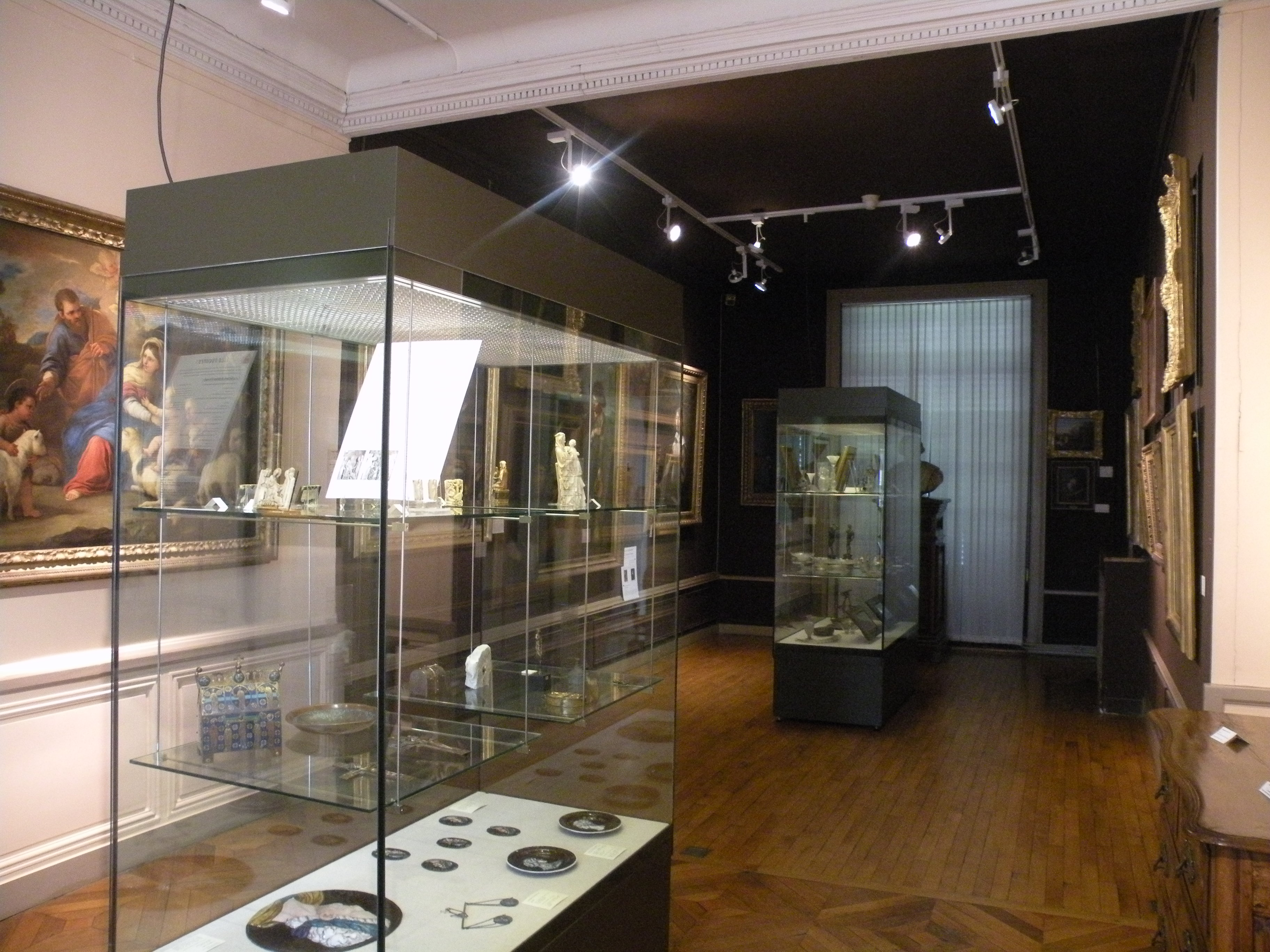
Interior; plaque from the Magdeburg Ivories (10th century), dimly visible on the top shelf of the display cabinet here

The Musée Antoine Vivenel is the municipal museum of the city of Compiègne in northern France, located at 2, rue d'Austerlitz, 60200 Compiègne. It was founded in 1839, following an important gift by Antoine Vivenel, architect and art collector.

The museum has one of the largest collections of Greek ceramics in France after the Louvre, some of which come from the collections of Lucien Bonaparte, Napoleon's brother and Prince of Canino, in Italy. The museum also benefits from the deposits of sculpted blocks from the Gallo-Roman temple of Champlieu located about twenty kilometers south-east of the city. The museum also has Egyptian artifacts (including a children's mummy) and artifacts of ancient Etruscans.

== Collections ==
=== Paintings ===
- Jean Bassange, (17th century), Adoration of the Shepherds, signed oil on canvas, 1,475 by 1,275.
- Langlois de Sézanne, (1757–1845 ?), Portrait of Madame Morel, pastel.
- Léon Matthieu Cochereau, (1793–1817), Portrait of Monsieur Chatard, left in 1925 by M. and Mme Léon Duchauvel.

=== Sculptures ===
- One of the 16 surviving Magdeburg Ivories, 10th century.
- Eugène Delaplanche, (1836–1891), Allegory of the Air, bronze.
- Auguste Joseph Peiffer, (1832–1886), Arab playing the mandolin and Arab playing the tambour.
