= Magdeburg Ivories =

Set of 17 ivory panels illustrating episodes of Christ's life

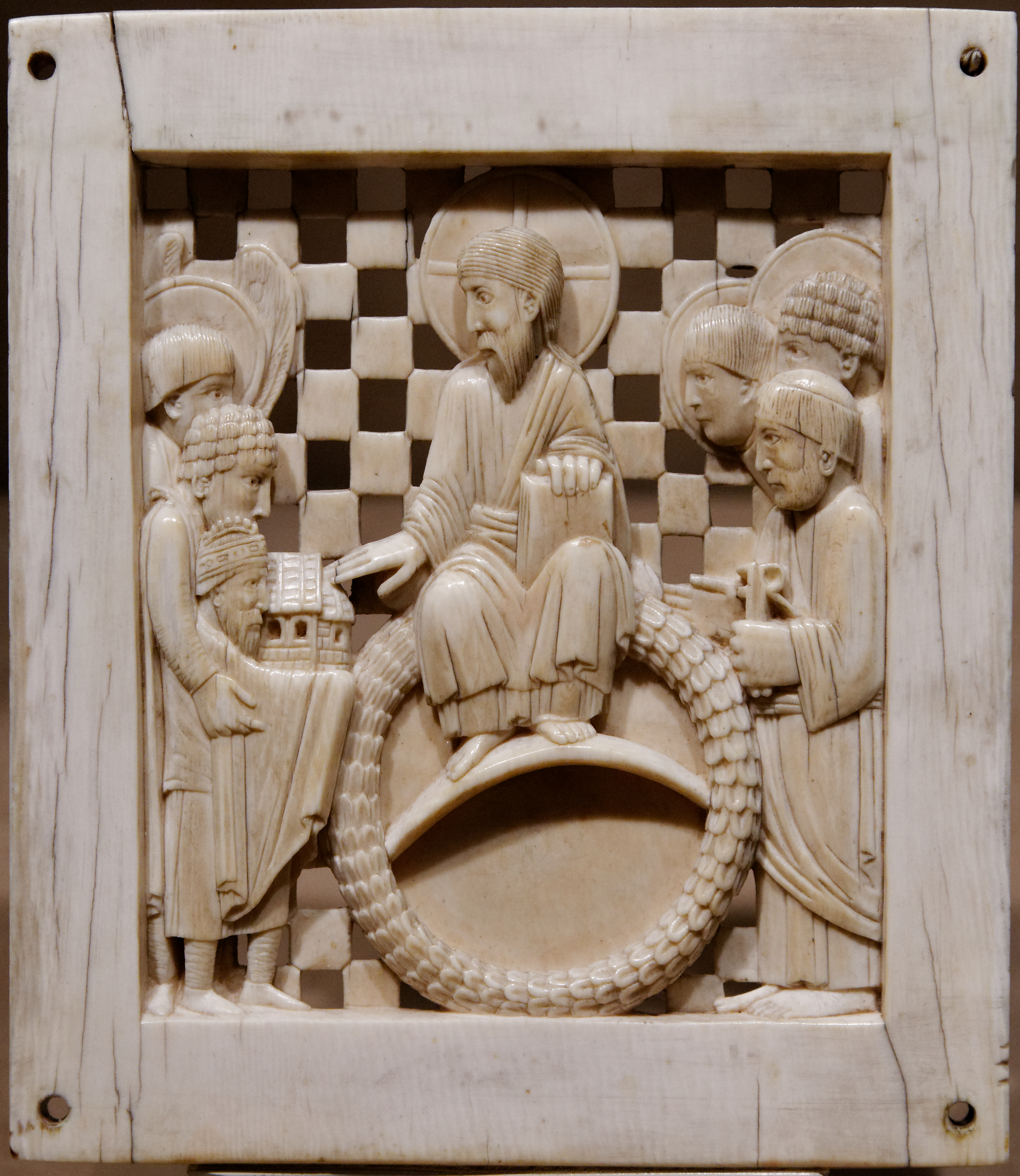
Christ receiving the cathedral from Otto I, Metropolitan Museum of Art

The Magdeburg Ivories are a set of 16 surviving ivory panels illustrating episodes of Christ's life. They were commissioned by Emperor Otto I, probably to mark the dedication of Magdeburg Cathedral, and the raising of the Magdeburg see to an archbishopric in 968. The panels were initially part of an unknown object in the cathedral that has been variously conjectured to be an antependium or altar front, a throne, door, pulpit, or an ambon; traditionally this conjectural object, and therefore the ivories as a group, has been called the Magdeburg Antependium. This object is believed to have been dismantled or destroyed in the 1000s, perhaps after a fire in 1049.

They are often assumed to have been made in Milan, then an important political and artistic center of the Holy Roman Empire; art historian Peter Lasko, however, has argued on stylistic grounds for artists trained in the Lorraine area, possibly in Metz. The group of plaques is widely considered a key example of Ottonian art, exemplifying in sculpture the Ottonian style that survives more often in manuscript illustrations.

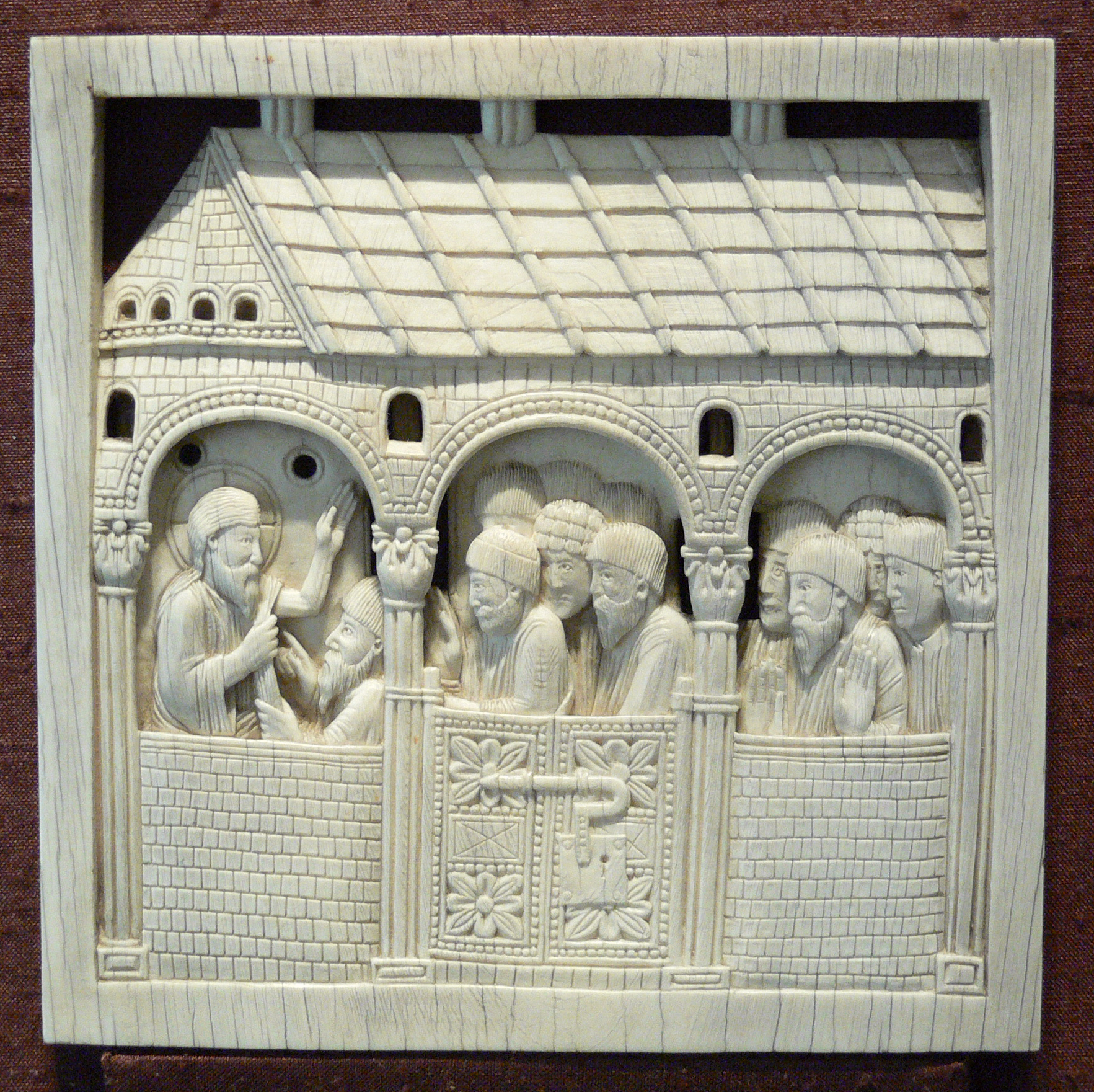
Christ appears to his disciples, and Doubting Thomas, Bavarian National Museum

== Description ==
The plaques all measure nearly 13 cm high and 12 cm wide. They are in the unusual form of framed scenes combining relief figures with an openwork background. The backgrounds have, depending on the scene depicted, foliage, checkerboard or cross patterns, or, as in the Visitation, an architectural setting behind the figures. In some scenes the number of figures leave no space for decoration of the background. The gaps in the openwork probably revealed a gold or gilded backing behind.

Two further panels are known from 16th-century drawings, and the original number was probably significantly larger, as many common subjects from the Life of Christ are absent, while some surviving subjects are rather rare. Lasko suggests that fewer than half the original group survive, and mentions the Carolingian cycle of 62 wall paintings at Saint John Abbey, Müstair, which includes seven of the fifteen narrative scenes in the ivories. The strong emphasis among the surviving plaques on episodes from the gospel accounts of Christ's period of ministry might suggest that they decorated a pulpit rather than an altar. On the function of the original object, Williamson favours a door, Lasko leans towards a pulpit, and Beckwith an antependium, but none are very emphatic in their preference. The style of the figures is described by Peter Lasko as "very heavy, stiff, and massive ... with extremely linear and flat treatment of drapery ... in simple but powerful compositions".

== Current locations ==
Following the dismantling of the object they were created for, the Magdeburg Ivories were then reused in reliquaries and book covers and are now dispersed to a total of nine museums. The Berlin State Library has four plaques, the World Museum in Liverpool and Bavarian National Museum in Munich have three each. the Louvre in Paris has two, and there are single plaques in the Musée Antoine Vivenel in Compiègne, Hessisches Landesmuseum in Darmstadt, British Museum in London, and Metropolitan Museum in New York. The four plaques in Berlin are inserted in the treasure binding of the 10th-century Codex Wittekindeus, while all the other plaques are now displayed as stand-alone objects.

== Workshop and artists ==
Though scholars are agreed the plaques come from the same workshop, the hands of different artists can be detected; for example the groups of plaques in Liverpool and Paris are by different hands. A further plaque, not from the Magdeburg set but thought to be from the same workshop, is now in the Cleveland Museum of Art. This was probably always meant for a book's treasure binding, and shows a standing Christ, with the heads of the Apostles emerging from the background to either side of him.

== Gallery ==
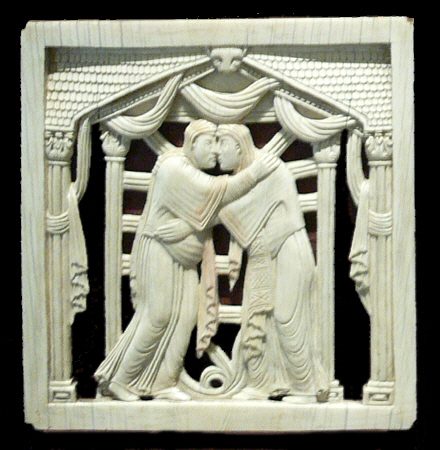
The Visitation, Bavarian National Museum

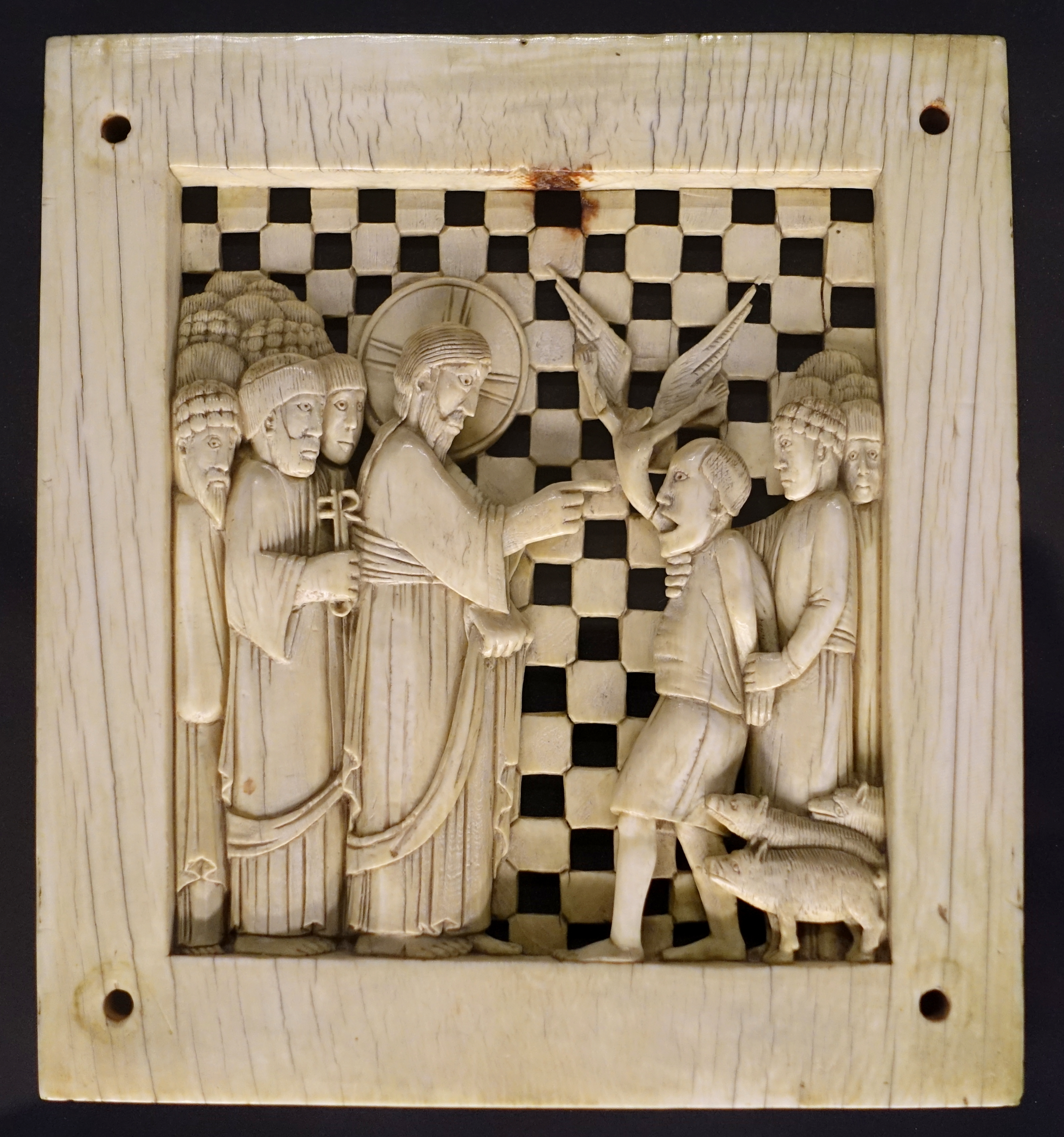
Christ healing the possessed Gerasene man, Hessisches Landesmuseum Darmstadt

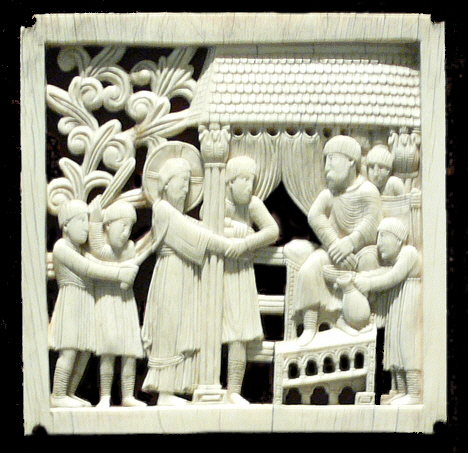
Christ before Pontius Pilate, and Flagellation of Christ, Bavarian National Museum

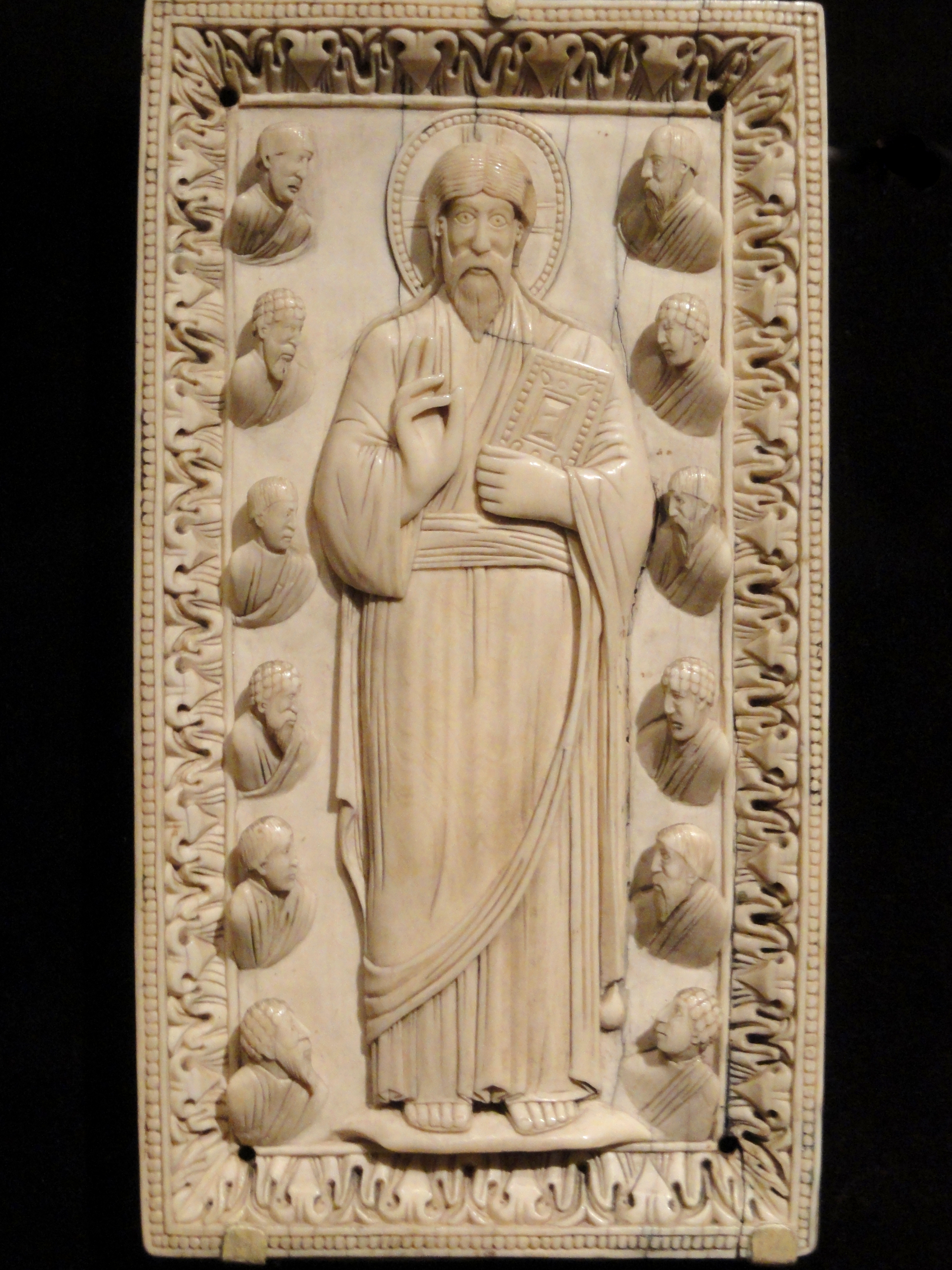
Plaque in Cleveland, thought to be from the same workshop.

== List of plaques ==
Listed in the same order as in Fillitz (2001):

1. Dedication scene: Christ receiving the cathedral from Otto I (now at the Metropolitan Museum of Art)
2. Traditio legis: transmission of the Law by Christ to Peter and Paul (Berlin State Library)
3. Visitation (Bavarian National Museum, Munich)
4. Finding in the Temple (Berlin State Library)
5. Jesus heals the possessed of Gerasa (Hessisches Landesmuseum Darmstadt)
6. Jesus performing miracles (Berlin State Library)
7. The second Miracle of Loaves and Fishes (Louvre, Paris)
8. Peter finds the tribute money in a fish's mouth (World Museum Liverpool)
9. Jesus blesses a little child (Louvre, Paris)
10. Raising of the son of the widow of Nain (British Museum)
11. Jesus in the House of Simon the Pharisee (Musée Antoine Vivenel, Compiègne)
12. Jesus and the woman taken in adultery (World Museum Liverpool)
13. Raising of Lazarus (Berlin State Library)
14. Flagellation and judgment of Jesus by Pilate (Bavarian National Museum, Munich)
15. Christ appears to Doubting Thomas and the other apostles (Bavarian National Museum, Munich)
16. Christ Commissioning the Apostles (World Museum Liverpool)

== See also ==
- Cultural depictions of Otto I, Holy Roman Emperor
