= Langlois de Sézanne =

French painter

Claude Louis Langlois (13 June 1757 – c. 1845), known as Langlois de Sézanne, was a French portraitist and pastel artist. His portrait of Madame Morel is held by the Musée Antoine Vivenel, Compiègne.

Born in Sézanne, he was the son of Claude Langlois and Marie Henriette Giffey. His works were displayed at different salons in Paris between 1806 and 1836 and at the Royal Academy in London in 1831, 1833, and 1841. He was the father of Claude Bernard Camille Langlois, whose works were displayed in 1831 and 1849. The latter's son Camille Langlois was exhibited in 1835 and 1849.

== Works ==
- Portrait of Madame Morel, with an etiquette in reverse: Langlois de Sezanne/Artiste-peintre des généraux, rue/Geofroy-Langevin, près la rue/St-Avoie, n° 323/A Paris, Musée Antoine Vivenel, Compiègne
- Two pastel paintings at Musée Quesnel-Morinière, Coutanges:
  - Portrait of Admiral Jean-Marthe-Adrien L'Hermite, the Brave (1766-1826)
  - Portrait of Baroness Lhermitte, wif eof the admiral
- Musée national du château de Versailles:Portrait of Godefroy Cavaignac (1801–45), part of the old Munier-Jolain collection, donated in 1907 and L. Langlois à Madame Cavaignac/Londres 18 juin 1839.
  - The painting was later displayed on 8 June 2007 at Hôtel Drouot in Paris.
- An etching made by Étienne Charles Voysard, a portrait painting from 1802 by the explorer Charles-Nicolas-Sigisbert Sonnini de Manoncourt.

== Salon display history ==
- 1806, no. 209: Pastel portrait of Mme. Hervé
- 1808, no. 347: Portrait of an Author; no. 348: Son of an Author; no. 349: Daughter of an Author
- 1810, no. 462: The Family of an Author

== Family ==
- Angélique Sophie Langlois, born in Sens on 29 May 1766
- Claude Charles Langlois, born in Sens on 10 June 1788
- Claude Bernard Camille Langlois (24 October 1790 in Sens - 1860 in Brighton, England)
