= François Guérin (artist) =

French painter (1717–1801)

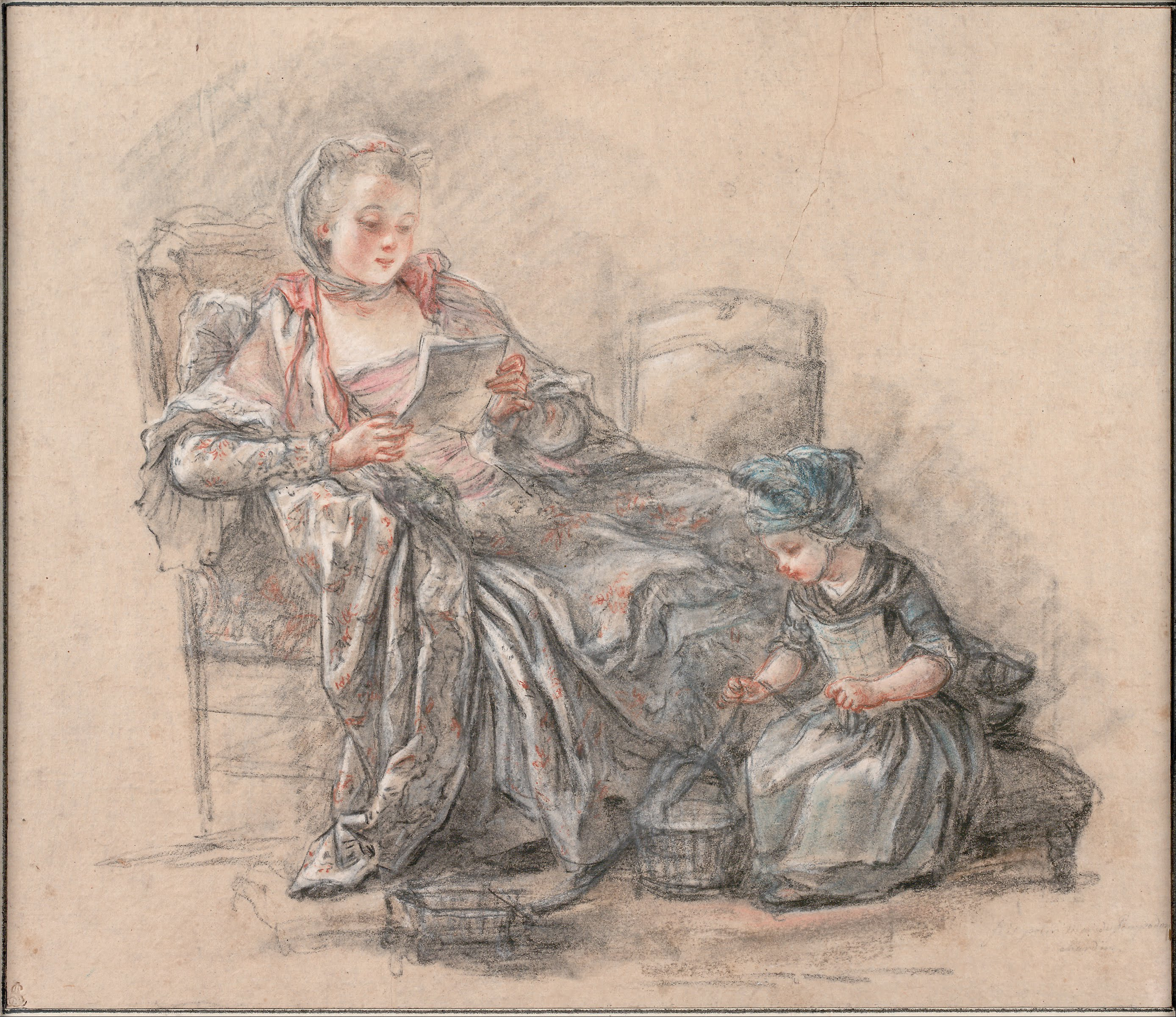
Guérin's 1748 portrait of a Woman reading and a girl playing (thought to be the Marquise de Pompadour with her daughter Alexandrine).

François Guérin (French pronunciation: [fʁɑ̃swa ɡeʁɛ̃]; 1717–1801) was a French 18th century artist, miniaturist and draughtsman, working in pastels and oil. He was a member of the Académie de Saint-Luc an institution for those artists prevented for various reasons, from joining the more prestigious Académie royale de peinture et de sculpture. However, the work of the Academie de Saint-Luc was so far from second rate that following a successful exhibition in 1777, the Royal Academy took offence, and with the backing of the monarchy, issued an edict in March 1776 abolishing “guilds, brotherhoods, and communities of arts and crafts”, forcing the Academie de Saint-Luc to close. Guérin had, however, been accepted into the more prestigious academy by 1761.

Guérin's chief principal works were bust portraits and conversation pieces - small informal paintings of groups or couples shown within a domestic setting.

== Life ==
Guérin is known to have had a son Thomas-François, but little more is reliably known. A 1748 portrait of Madame de Pompadour with her daughter indicates that he was active at Versailles in the mid 18th century. However, a second portrait, painted in the late 1760s, once thought to be Pompadour in discussion with the Duc de Choiseul, is now thought to be of two anonymous sitters due to the work recording precisely the furnishings which were too unfashionable for a salon of either Choiseul or Pompadour.
