= Jean Bassange =

French painter

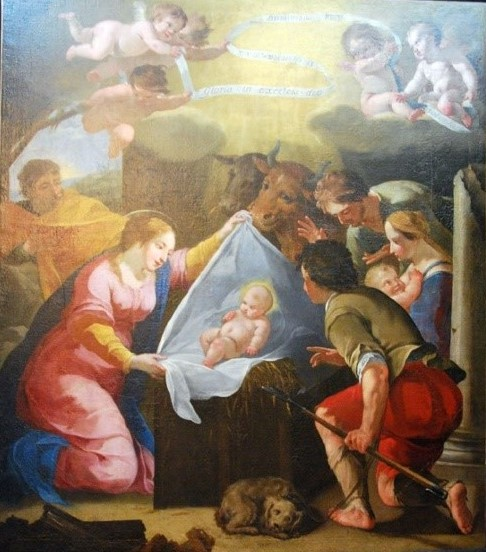
Jean Bassange, Adoration of the Shepherds (Musée Antoine Vivenel)

Jean Bassange was a French painter active in Paris in the 17th century and in the Académie de Saint-Luc. He was only known as a name until he was cited for the first time by Jules Guiffey in 1915. Musée Antoine Vivenel holds his only surviving work, an Adoration of the Shepherds, rediscovered by that museum's curator Éric Blanchegorge - this painting inspired a work by Simon Vouet, later engraved by François Perrier. Guillaume Kazerouni also writes of documents from 1628 to 1654 mentioning the painter.

== Bibliography ==
- Jules Guiffrey, « Histoire de l'Académie de Saint-Luc », Archives de l'art français, nouvelle période, Tome IX, 1915, p. 177.
- Guillaume Kazerouni, « Jean Bassange, peintre de l'Académie de Saint-Luc » Cahiers d'histoire de l'Art, n° 4, 2006, p. 19-21.
