= Jean-Baptiste Lallemand =

French painter (1716-1803)

Jean-Baptiste Lallemand (1716–1803) was a French artist born in Dijon, France. He was mainly a painter and draftsman of landscapes and genre works. He sometimes signed himself Lallemant or Allemanus. After a stay in Italy, he went to Paris and became a member of the Académie de Saint-Luc. He died in Paris.

== Works ==
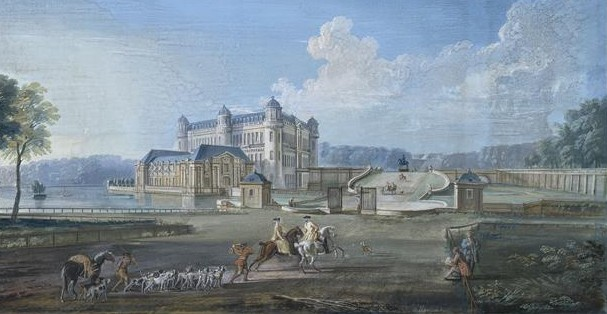
The château de Chantilly in the 18th century, after works by the Condés. Gouache. Musée Condé.

The Musée des Beaux-Arts de Dijon owns many of his works, including a drawing and a painting showing the Château de Montmusard. His works also feature in the collections of the Musée Carnavalet and the Cabinet des estampes of the Bibliothèque nationale, both in Paris.

=== Paintings ===
- The prince de Lambesc charging at the head of the régiment Royal allemand, 12 July 1789, oil on canvas - Musee Carnavalet
- Taking of the Bastille, 14 July 1789, oil on canvas - Musee Carnavalet
- Massacre of Jacques de Flesselles, 14 July 1789, oil on canvas
- Pillaging of the weapons at les Invalides, morning of 14 July 1789, oil on canvas
- c. 1790/1795 : Arrest of the governor of the Bastille, 14 July 1789, oil on canvas, 63 x 80 cm, Vizille, Musée de la Révolution française
- Pillaging of the Hôtel des Invalides 1789, oils
- Pyramid of Caius Cestius in Rome
- Bourgeois cookery
- "A port with elegant figures and fishermen on the quay and classical ruins beyond" and "figures by a fountain among classical ruins in a port", two oil on canvas 101x139 and 101x138, formerly Galerie Segoura-Paris, Christie's New York 19 oct 2006, Fondazione Terruzzi-Bordighera, Moncalieri (Turin) private collection (published in Giancarlo Sestieri "Il capriccio architettonico in Italia", Roma 2015, II, page 252-253).

=== Drawings ===
- View of the city and port of Rouen, capture of the faubourg Saint-Sever, drawing
- View of the porte Saint-Maclou, ancient caves and courts, near the botanical gardens in Rouen, drawing
- View of part of the city of Rouen and the promenades of the old palace, from the faubourg Saint-Sever, drawing
- View of the bourse in Rouen, seen from the porte Arangrie, drawing
- Second view of the bourse at the city of Rouen, drawing
- View of the salines of Lons-le-Saulnier, in Franche-Comté

=== Watercolour drawings ===
- 1775 c - La Halle aux Veaux, wash, pen and watercolour, Sbd, Dim: 18,5 cm x 32,3 cm Réserve dessins Musée Carnavalet

=== Engravings ===
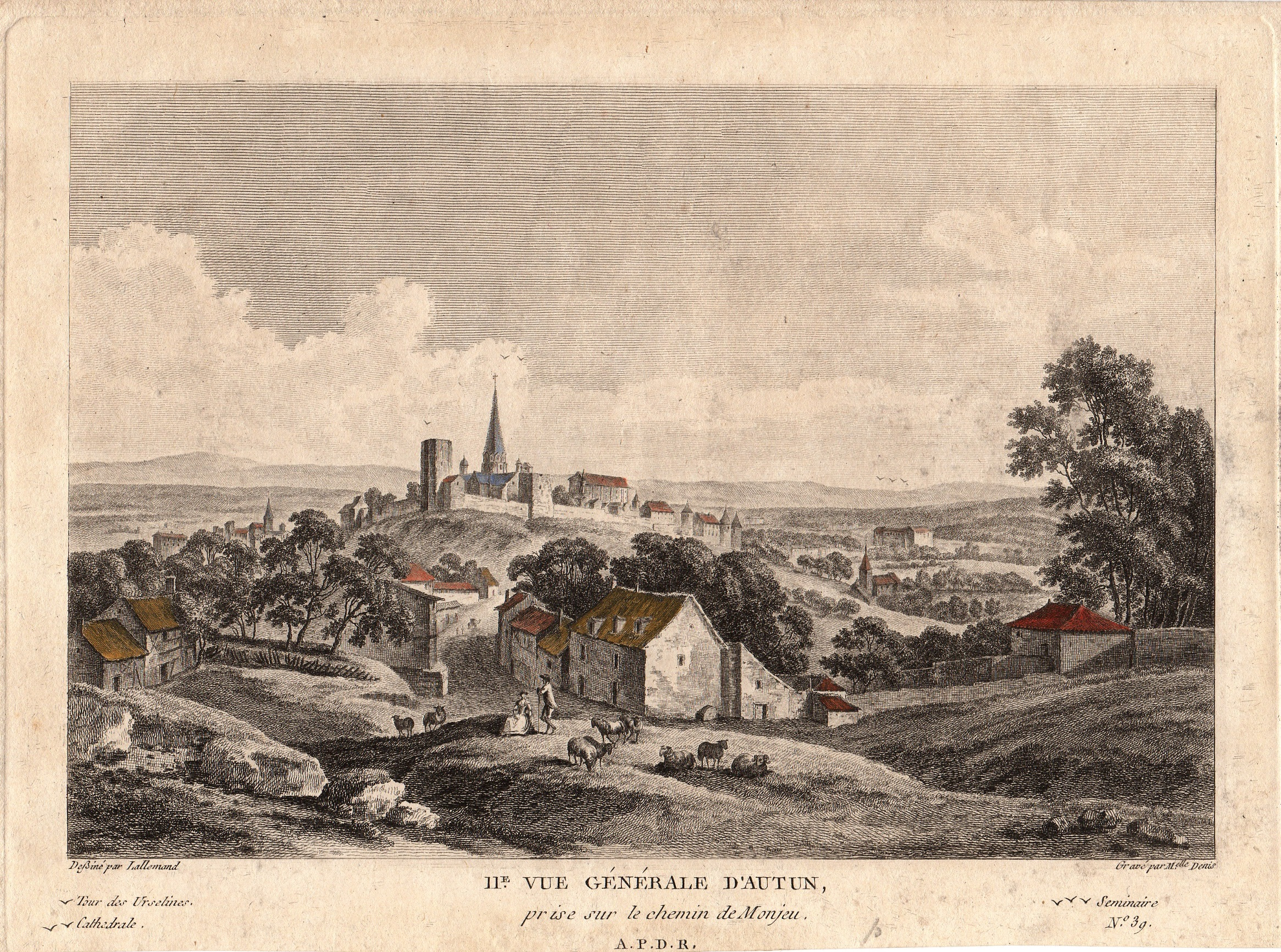
View of Autun from the chemin de Monjeu (c.1780) - engraving by Mademoiselle Denis after a drawing by Lallemand

- Several city views, notably from Burgundy

In the engraving shown right, note the indication of major buildings by the placement one or more flying birds over them: one bird over the Tour des Ursulines, two over the cathedral, three over the seminary. The initials APDR signify Avec Privilèges Du Roi (with the king's privilege). This burin engraving has been hand-coloured—some roofs are covered with blue slates (as with the church), others are in red to indicate tiles.

== Bibliography ==
- Exhibition catalogue, "Un paysagiste dijonnais du XVIII° siècle: Jean-Baptiste Lallemand", Dijon, Musée des Beaux-Arts, 1954, by M. Quarré and Mme Geiger
- Claude-Gérard, Marcus Jean-Baptiste Lallemand, Paris, 1996
