= Auguste Joseph Peiffer =

French sculptor

Auguste Joseph Peiffer (1832 – between 1879 and 1886) was a French sculptor, mainly working in bronze on allegorical and mythological subjects. He exhibited at the Paris Salon from 1865 to 1879.

The Musée Antoine Vivenel at Compiègne hold his statuettes of Arab playing the mandolin and Arab playing the tambour.
