= Henri Bonnart =

French painter and engraver

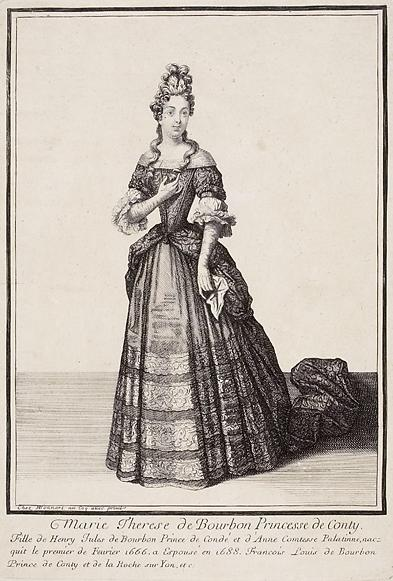
Engraving of Marie Thérèse de Bourbon by Henri Bonart, c.1690. Collection of the Museum of Ile-de-France

Henri Bonnart (1642 – 1711) was a French painter and engraver. He was born in Paris in 1642, became rector of the Académie de Saint-Luc, and died in Paris in 1711. Le Blanc attributes to him 201 plates, of which 20 are religious subjects, 46 portraits, and 135 costume prints.

He had three brothers: Robert, Jean-Baptiste, and Nicolas Bonnart.

His son, Jean Baptiste Henri Bonnart, followed his father's profession, and died in 1726, aged about 48 years. In Perrault's Cabinet des Beaux- Arts, published in Paris in 1690, there is a plate of a ceiling ornamented with figures, which is probably by him. It is etched in a free, masterly style, finished with the graver, and marked "Jean Bonnart, Junior, del. et sculpt."

== Gallery ==
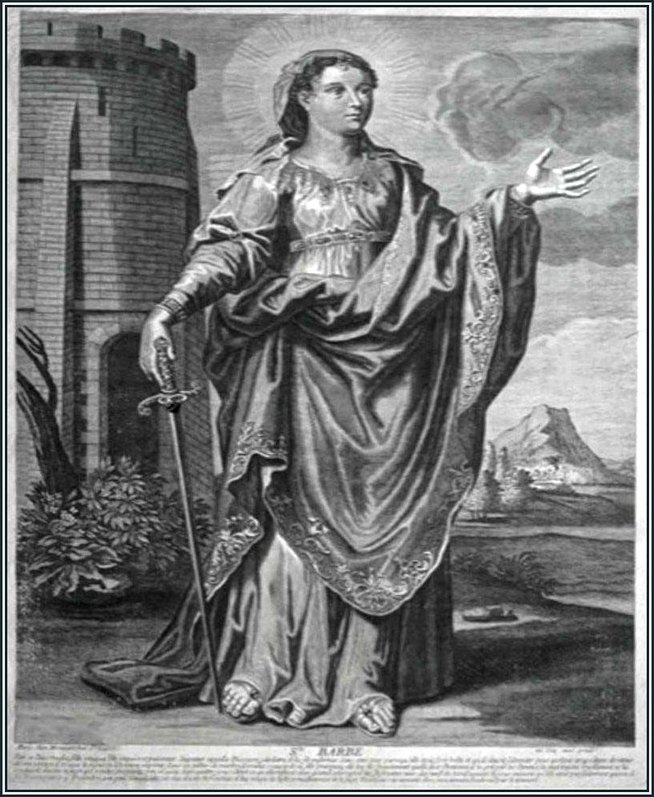
Saint Barbara (1690)

Madame la marquise de Florensac (1694)

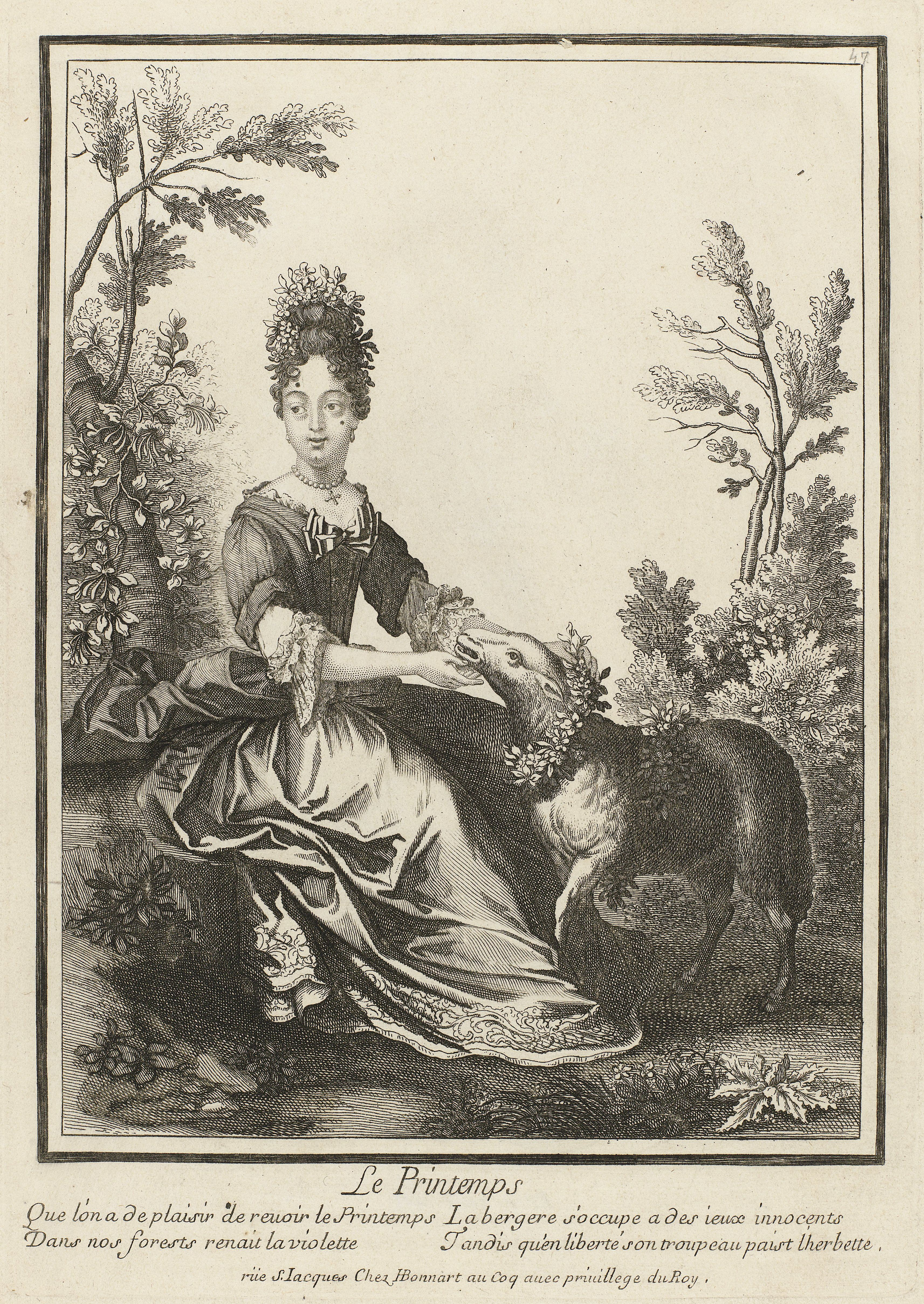
Le Printemps, personification of spring

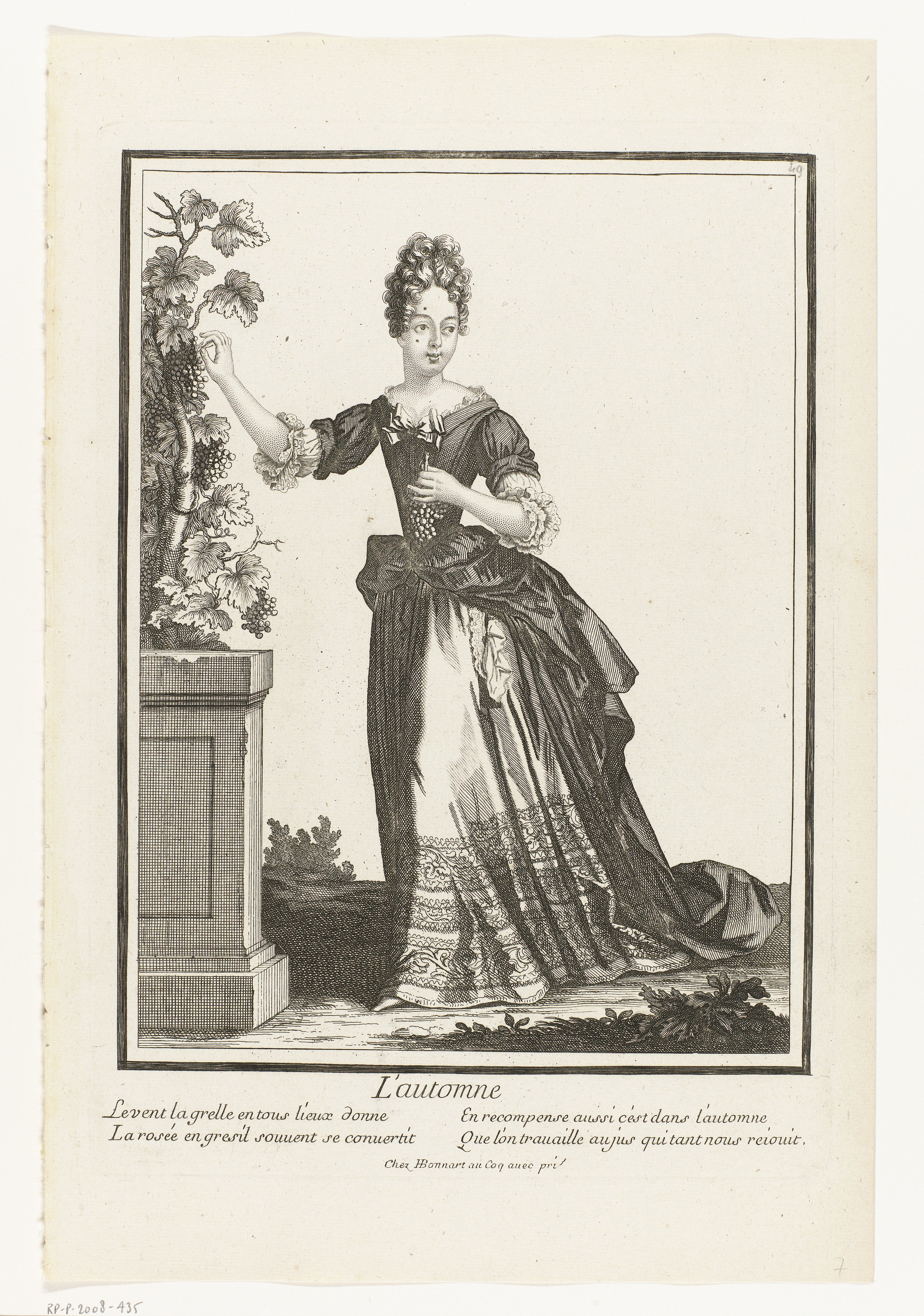
L'Automne, personification of autumn

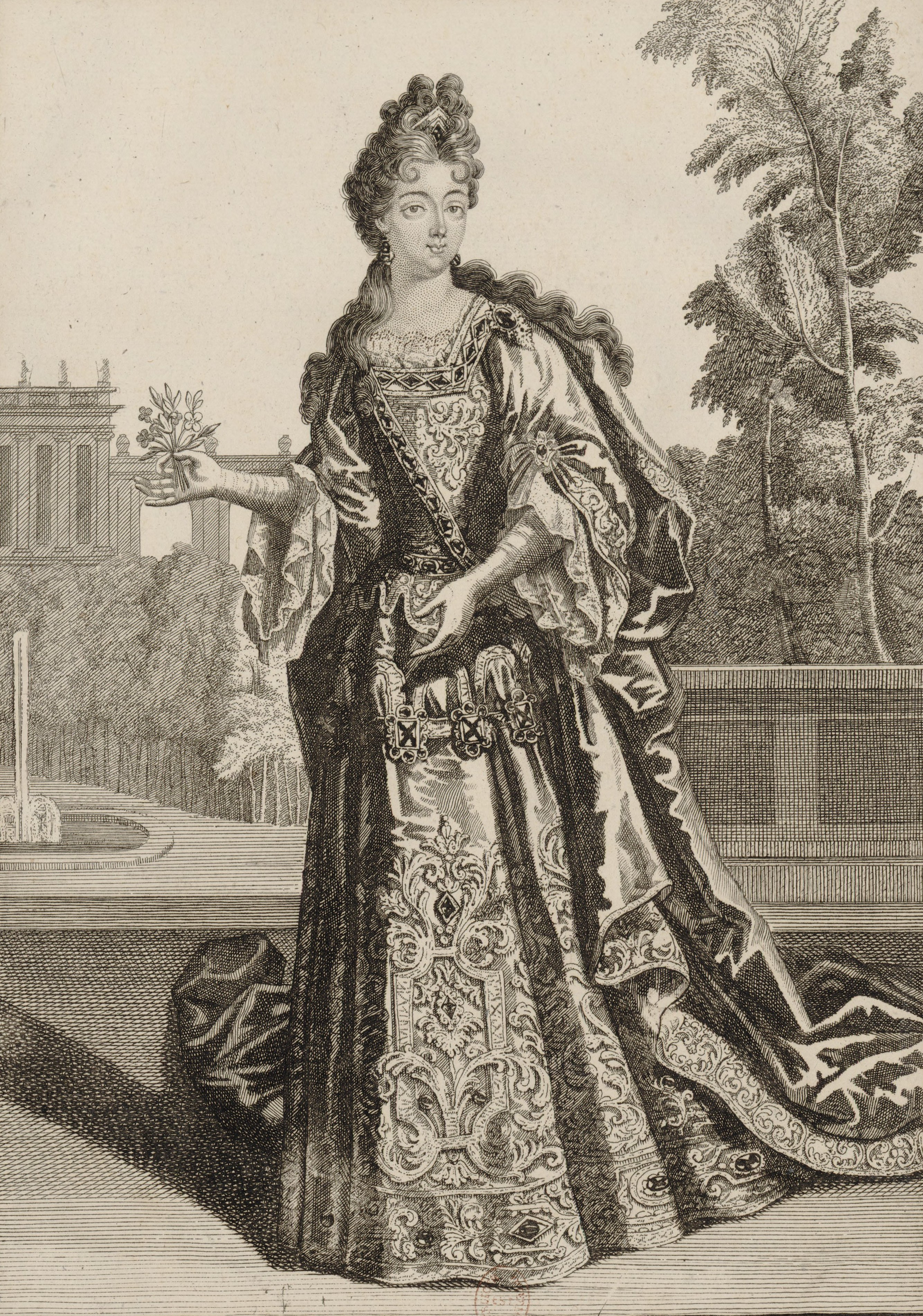
Duchess of Savoy, Anne Marie d'Orléans after her marriage
