= Codex Wittekindeus =

Illuminated Gospel Book

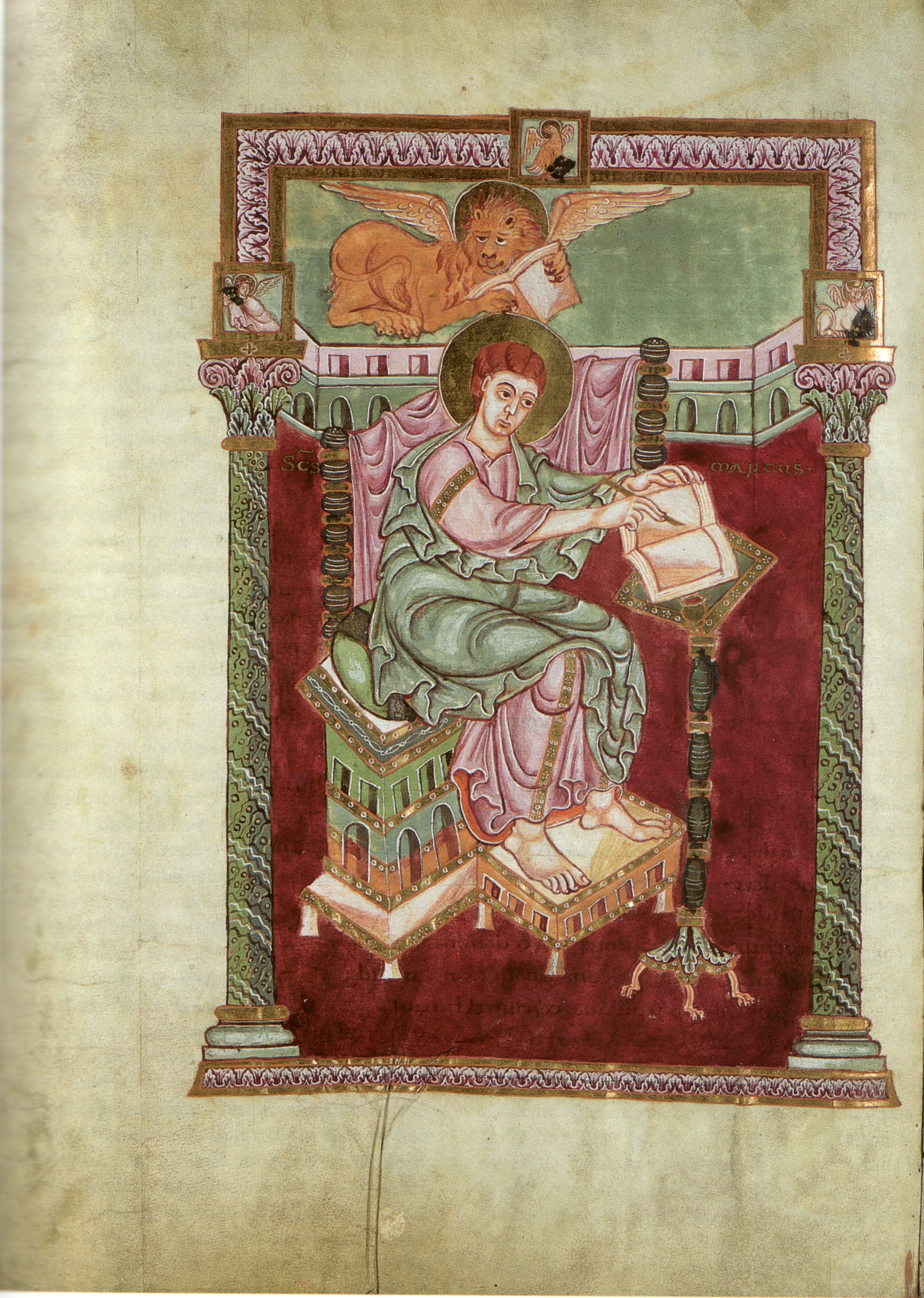
Mark the Evangelist

The Codex Wittekindeus is a 128-folio illuminated Gospel Book, produced in Fulda Abbey in Germany around 970–980. Alongside the Gero Codex, the Codex Wittekindeus is considered one of the two "greatest works in the initial Ottonian revival of book-illumination".

The treasure binding includes four of the recycled Magdeburg Ivories, Ottonian plaques from another object that was probably destroyed in a fire.

The book was long held at the church in Enger and owes its name to Widukind, Duke of Saxony, who was said to have received the manuscript from Charlemagne. It was, however, not made until long after their time; its illuminations likely derived from a lost work of the Ada School of Carolingian art. Fulda was founded by a missionary from England, St Boniface, and besides following the Carolingian tradition, the book shares features with Anglo-Saxon illuminated manuscripts of the time, such as "fluttering, restless draperies".

It is now held as Codex Theol. Lat. fol. 1 in the Berlin State Library.

== Sources ==
- https://web.archive.org/web/20170103003604/http://staatsbibliothek-berlin.de/aktuelles/presse/pressebilder/schaetze/
- Mayr-Harting, Henry (1999). Ottonian book illumination: an historical study. Harvey Miller. ISBN 978-1-872501-74-1.
- Reuter, Timothy; McKitterick, Rosamond (1995). The New Cambridge Medieval History: Volume 3, C.900-c.1024. Cambridge University Press. pp. 225–. ISBN 978-0-521-36447-8.
- Dodwell, Charles Reginald (1993). The Pictorial Arts of the West, 800-1200. Yale University Press. ISBN 978-0-300-06493-3.
