= Nicolas Fouché =

French painter

Nicolas Fouché (1653–1733) was a French painter.

Fouché was born in Troyes, the son of painter Léonard Fouché. He was received into the Académie de Saint-Luc on 15 March 1679. The abbé de Monville, biographer of Pierre Mignard, called Fouché one of his students. Cardinal Melchior de Polignac owned a series of paintings of the eight liberal arts by Fouché, inventorised by his heir, in 1738. He died in Paris.

== Works ==
- Budapest, Fine Arts Museum, Pomona, oil on canvas, 1, 475 by 1,145 m.

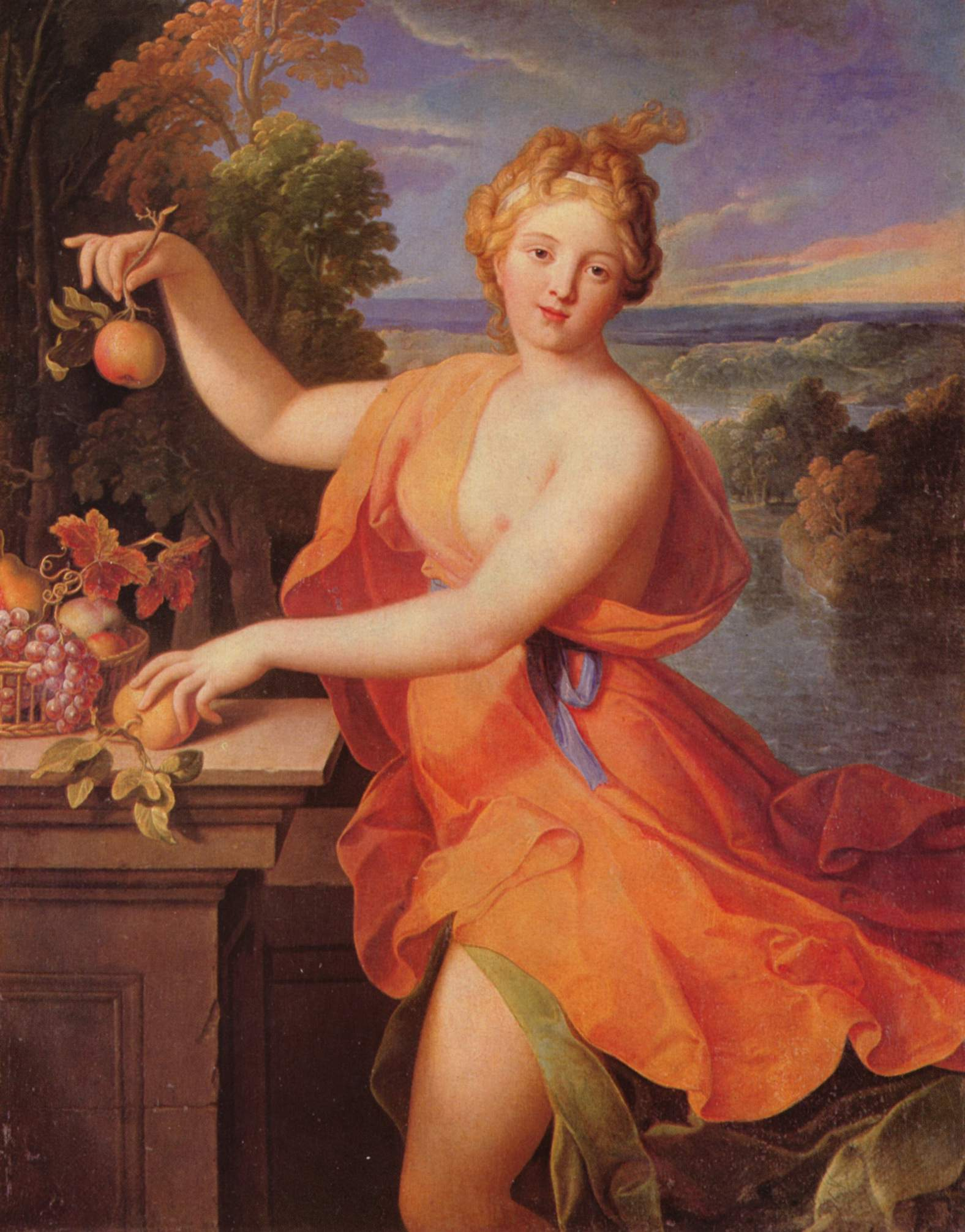
Pomona, 1700

- London, Sotheby
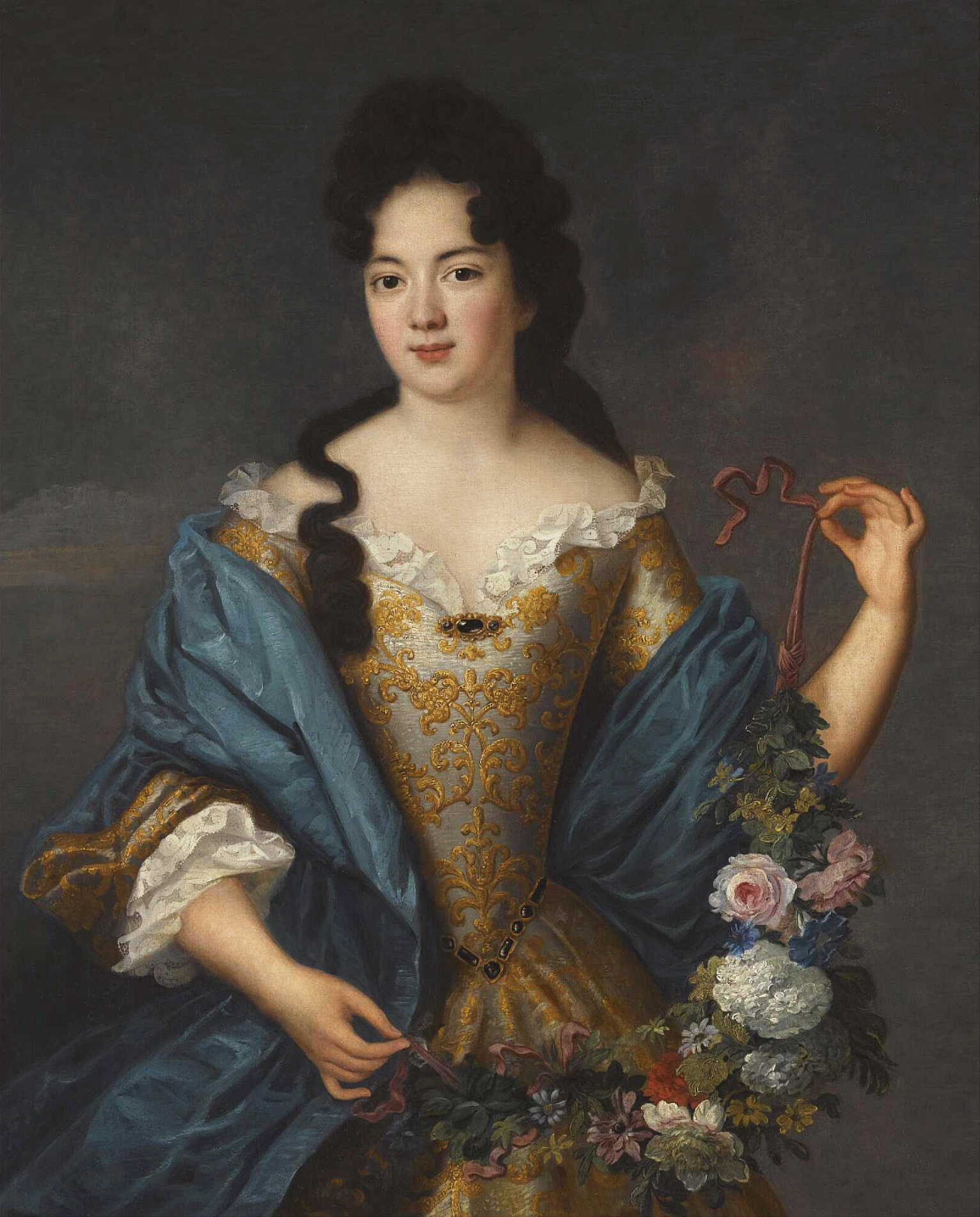
  Portrait of a Lady, half length, wearing an embroidered dress with a blue shawl, holding a garland of flowers, 1690s
- Tours, musée des Beaux-arts, La Poèsie, at the château de Chanteloup prior to the revolution, oil on canvas, 1,10 by 0,81 m.

== Engravers of his work ==
- Louis Desplaces (1682–1739)
- Audran family
- Gérard Edelinck
- James Johnson

== Bibliography ==
- Wildenstein, "Nicolas Fouché peintre de l'Académie de Saint-Luc vers 1650-1733", Gazette des Beaux-Arts, novembre 1964, n° 3.
- David Brouzet, "La Poésie du Musée des Beaux-Arts de Tours attribuée à Nicolas Fouché", Les Cahiers d'histoire de l'art, 2007.
