= Bavarian National Museum =

Museum in Munich, Germany

- Bayerisches Nationalmuseum
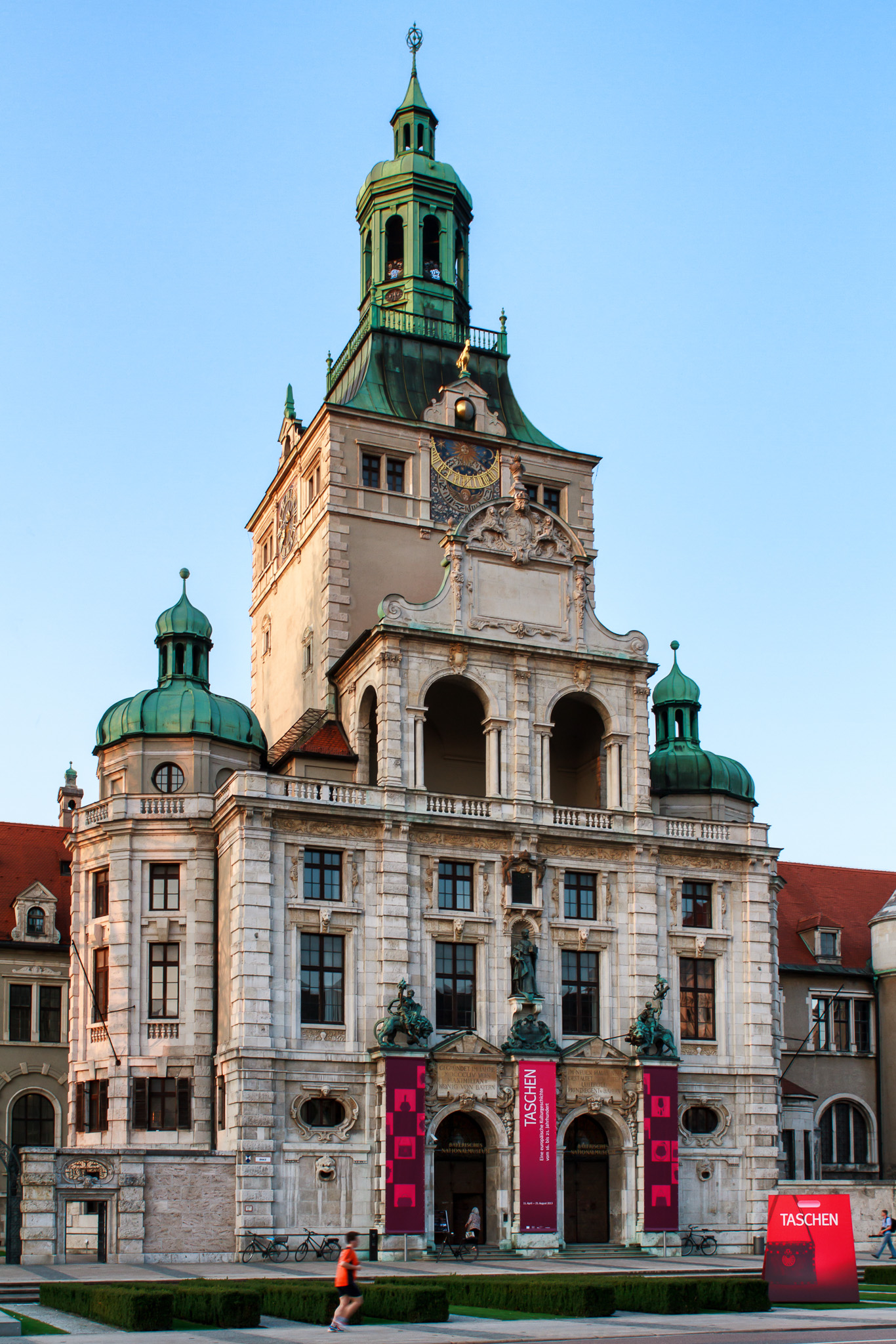
- Bavarian National Museum
- Established: 1855
- Location: Prinzregentenstraße 3, 80538 Munich, Germany
- Coordinates: 48°08′35″N 11°35′28″E
- Type: Art museum
- Founder: Maximilian II of Bavaria
- Website: www.bayerisches-nationalmuseum.de

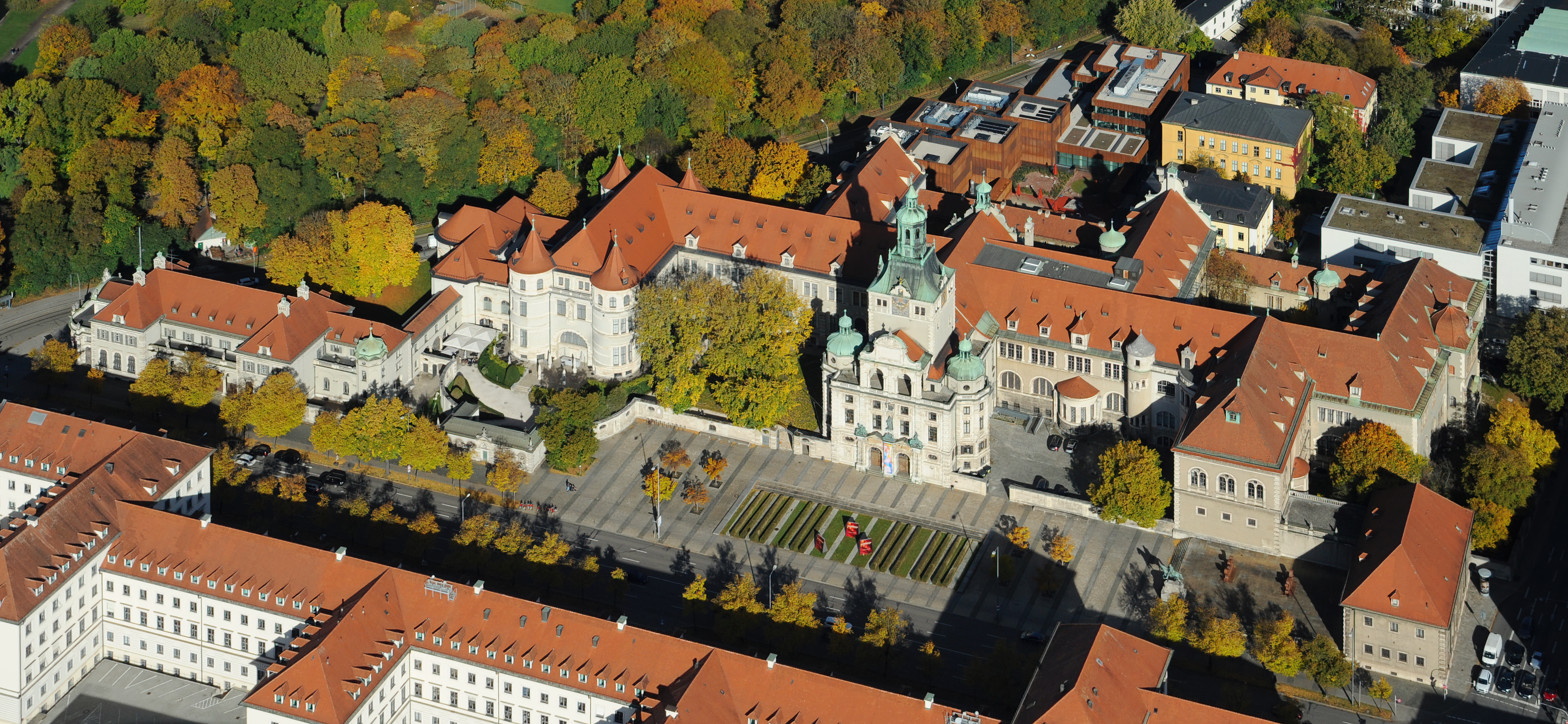
Aerial view of the Bavarian National Museum

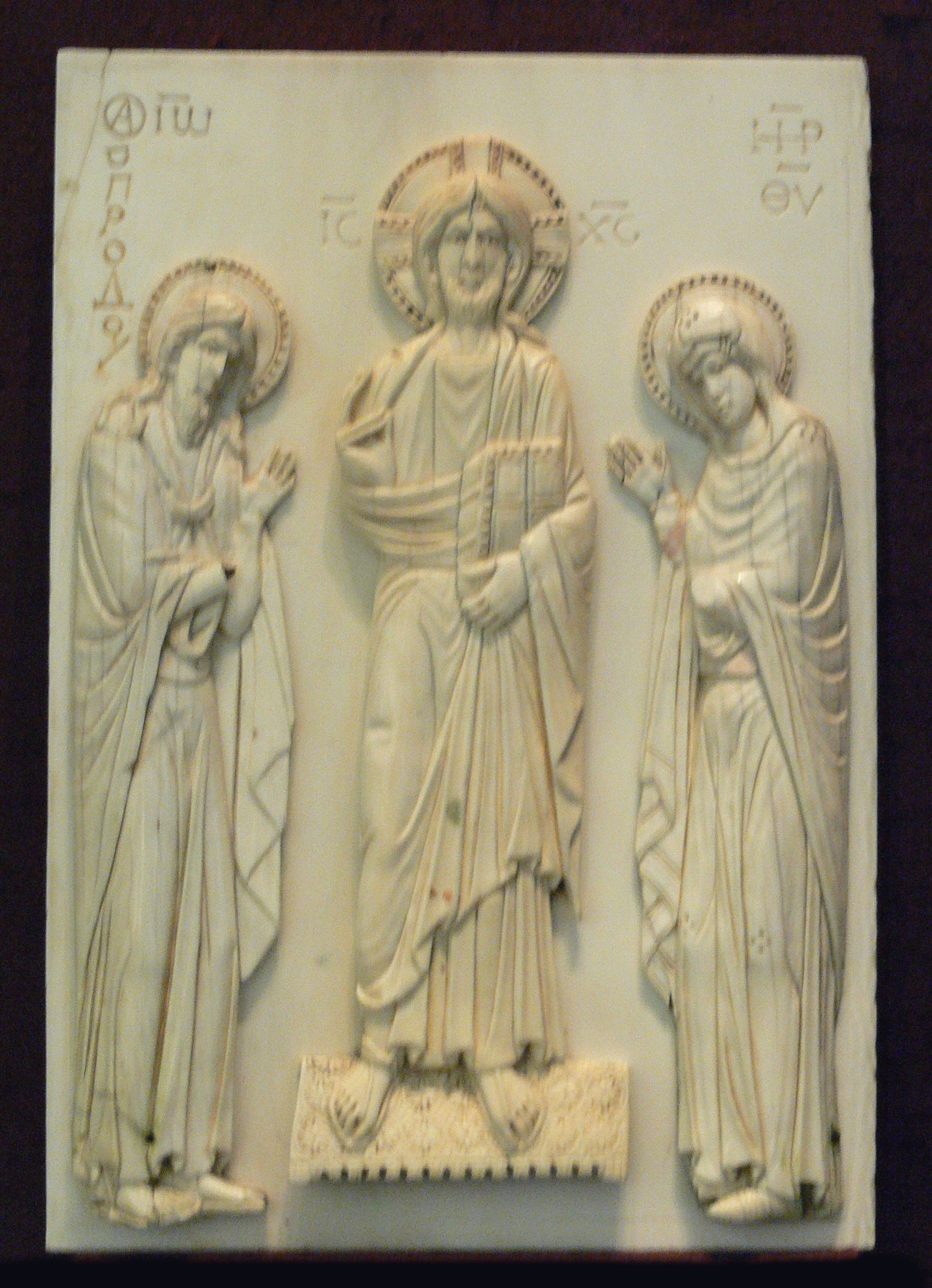
Byzantine ivory

The Bavarian National Museum (German: Bayerisches Nationalmuseum) in Munich is one of the most important museums of decorative arts in Europe and one of the largest art museums in Germany. Since the beginning the collection has been divided into two main groups: the art historical collection and the folklore collection.

== History and building ==
The museum was founded by King Maximilian II of Bavaria in 1855. It houses a large collection of European artifacts from the late antiquity until the early 20th century with particular strengths in the medieval through early modern periods.

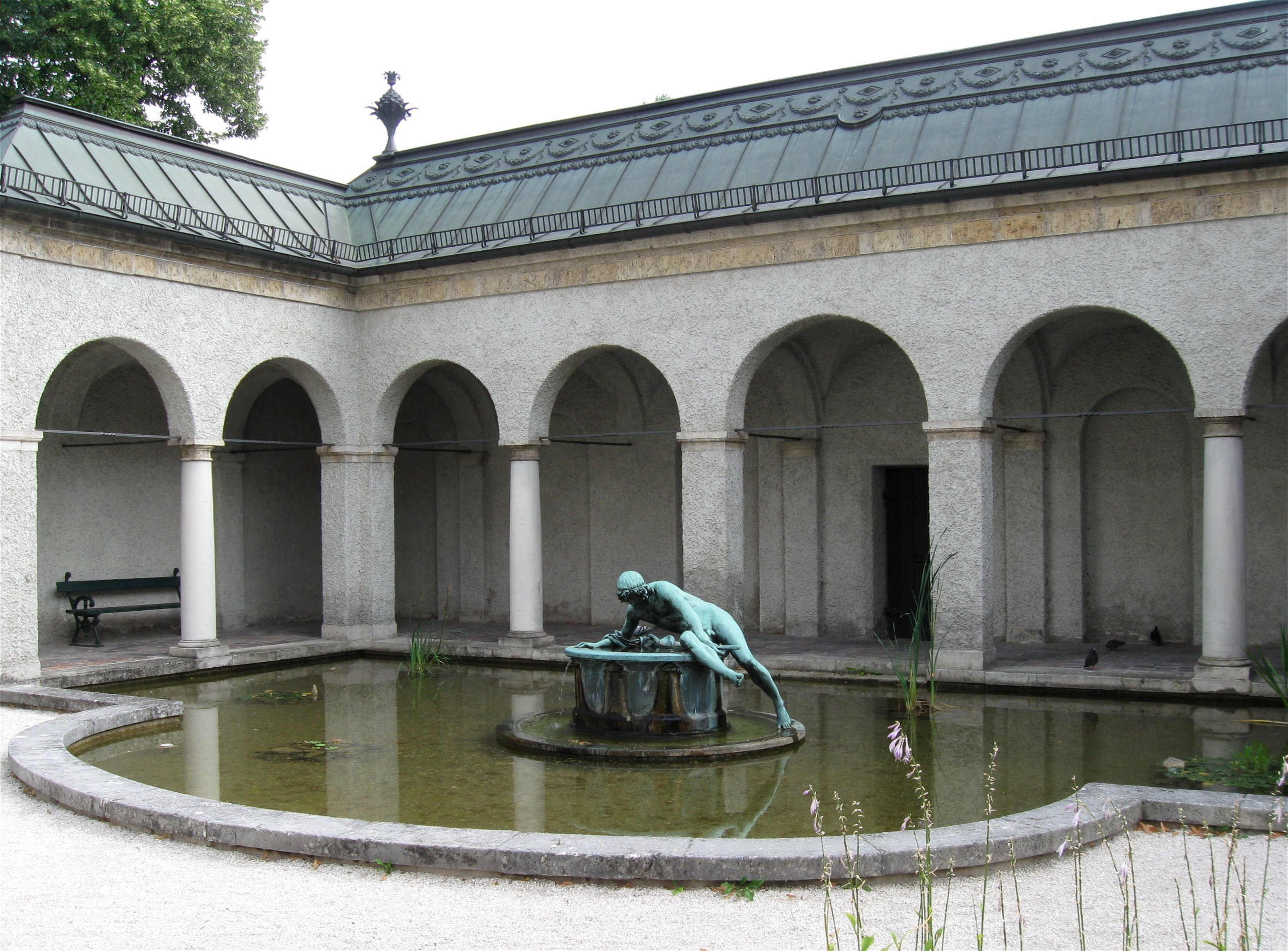
Narcissus fountain in the courtyard

The building, erected in the style of historicism by Gabriel von Seidl 1894-1900, is one of the most original and significant museum buildings of its time. It is situated in the Prinzregentenstraße, one of the city's four royal avenues. The house replaced an older building which houses today the Museum Five Continents. Already in 1905/06, the museum was expanded to the north by a few rooms and a workshop wing. German Bestelmeyer added a wing at the southeast corner in 1937.

The main building of the Bavarian National Museum includes on three floors exhibition rooms with in total about 13,000 square meters. The core of the collection dates from the art collection of the Wittelsbach family. This gives the National Museum an importance far beyond the local area. Diversity and breadth of the collections, however, were particularly motivated by the new additions to the subsequent period. To date, the inventory is updated continuously not only through acquisitions, but also by significant foundations and bequests. Support experienced by the National Museum, in particular, by the 1960 launched club "Friends of the Bavarian National Museum".

In 2012, The Bavarian National Museum restituted a bronze statue to the heirs of a Jewish collector named August L. Meyer whose art collection was seized by Nazis before he was murdered in the Holocaust. The museum had acquired the bronze in 1937. Efforts have been made to return some silver objects to the heirs of other Holocaust victims as well.

The National Museum has several branch museums throughout Bavaria. A new building behind the museum houses as addition the Bavarian State Archaeological Collection (Archäologische Staatssammlung) from the first settlement in the Paleolithic Ages through the Celtic civilization and the Roman period right up to the early Middle Ages.

== Decorative arts ==
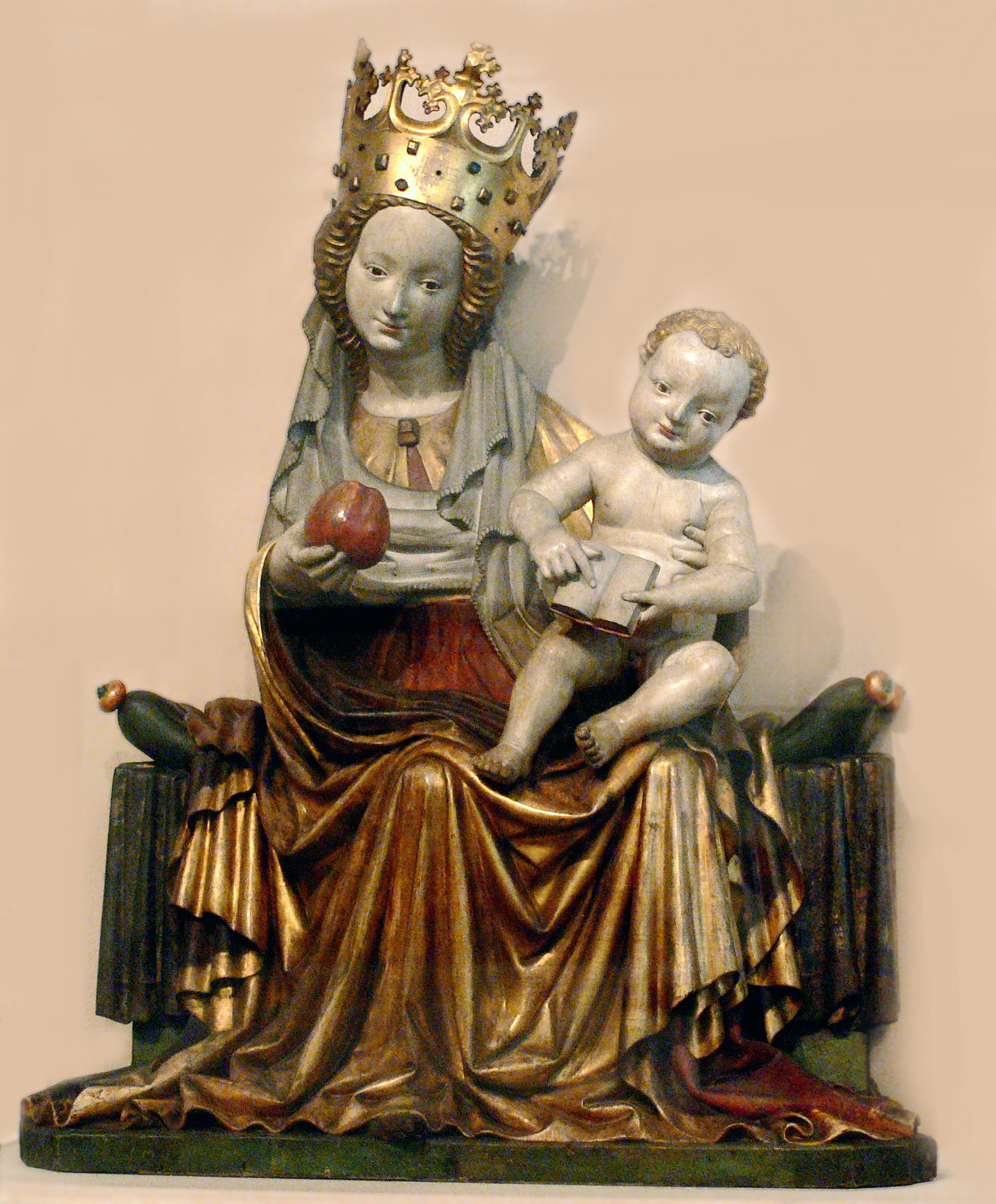
The gothic Madonna from Seeon Abbey

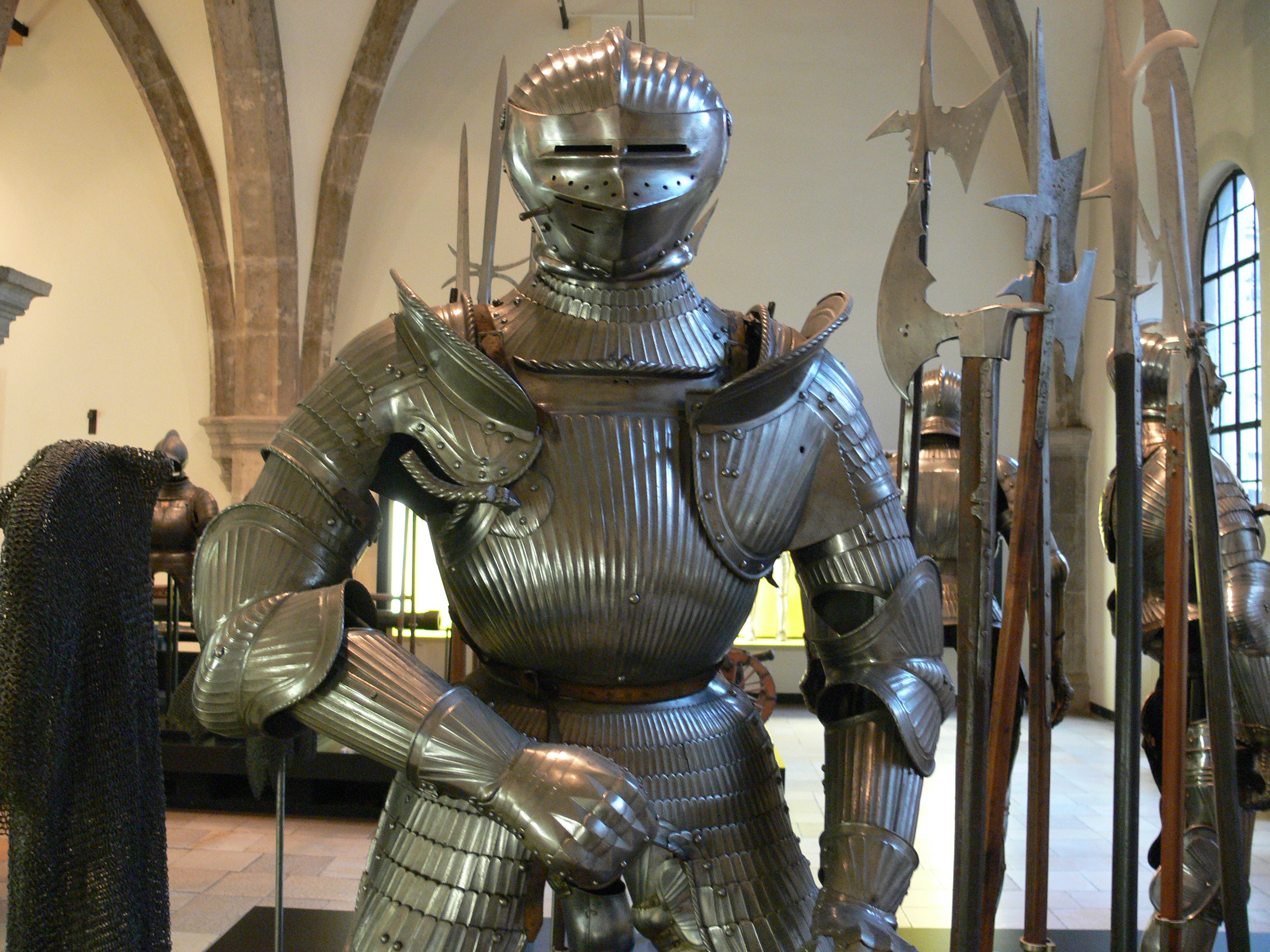
Medieval knight's armour

The art collection displays artworks in a tour through more than forty rooms from the hall for late antiquity and Romanesque art via the rooms for Gothic, Renaissance, Baroque and Rococo art to the exhibits of Neoclassicism and Art Nouveau. The western side wing of the museum houses The Bollert Collection with late medieval sculptures.

The museum is especially noted for its collections of carved ivory, goldsmith works, textiles, glass painting, tapestries and shrines. The displayed sculptures were created by noted sculptors including Erasmus Grasser, Tilman Riemenschneider, Hans Multscher, Hans Leinberger, Adam Krafft, Giovanni Bologna, Hubert Gerhard, Adriaen de Vries, Massimiliano Soldani Benzi, Johann Baptist Straub, Ferdinand Tietz, Ignaz Günther, Matthias Steinl, and Ludwig Schwanthaler. The museum is famous for its collections of courtly culture, musical instruments, furniture, oil paintings, sketches, clocks, stoneware, majolica, miniatures, porcelain and faience, and its statues. It has probably the world's best collection of the Nymphenburg porcelain figures of Franz Anton Bustelli (1723–63).

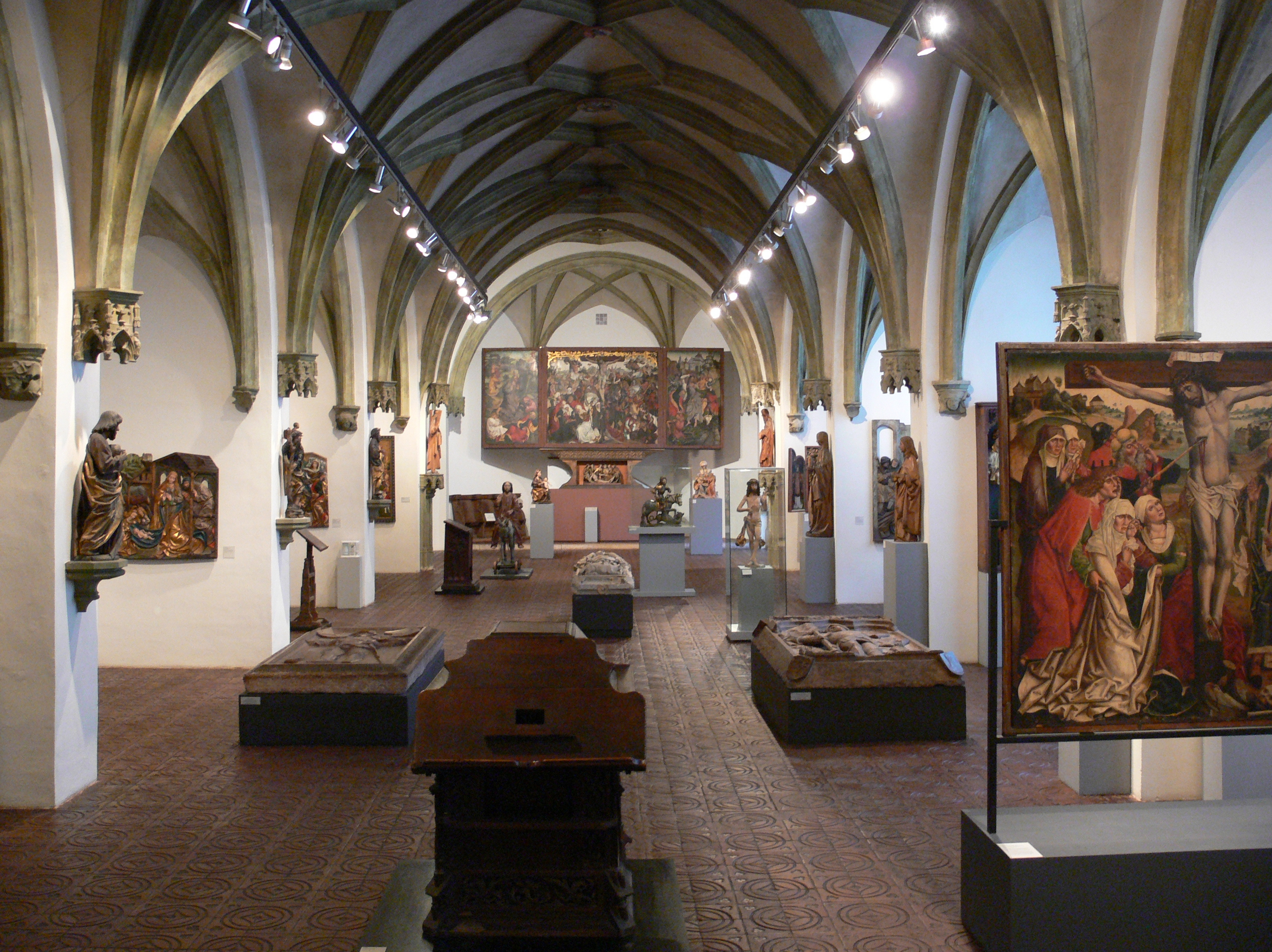
Medieval art

The Romanesque period is represented by stone sculptures from the monastery of Wessobrunn and the marble lions from Reichenhall. Important pieces of Romanesque art include wooden figures of crucifixion groups from Bamberg, Schongau and Kaufbeuren, and several works of metal and ivory. The Kasten der Heiligen Kunigunde (jewelry box of Holy Cunegonde), is a unique masterpiece made in the year 1000 in Scandinavia of wood, bronze and narwhal tusk. Reliefs from the Magdeburg Ivories, plaques probably from an antependium of Emperor Otto I and a relief of the West Roman imperial court with one of the oldest representations of the Ascension among the most famous works in the ivory collection. Key works of ivory art, important stained glass windows, and not least excellent testimonies of textile are found in the Gothic department. On display are also historic Gothic chamber ensembles such as the magnificently painted Zunftstube of Augsburg weavers, one of the finest Gothic cabinets at all. The Bavarian National Museum displays one of the largest and most important collections of late medieval sculpture from the German-speaking countries. Special attractions are the great knight's hall with the ceremonial armor of the 15th and 16th Century and the true to scale wooden Renaissance models of the Bavarian ducal capitals.

The portrait art of the Renaissance is represented by medals, miniatures, paintings and full plastic sculptures. Many items come from the art chamber of the Wittelsbach family. From the possession of the Wittelsbach the Bavarian National Museum also presents unique Baroque objects from all areas of craft and artistic production, such as ostentatious furniture, jewelry, weapons, musical instruments, watches, glasses, miniatures, ivories and bronzes. Of importance are especially Florentine bronzes from the collection of the Medici and pastel paintings from Venice including works of Rosalba Carriera. The Bavarian National Museum has the most important collection of the Bavarian Rococo sculpture. A rich collection of architectural models and designs for frescoes and altarpieces documents the new buildings and conversions of churches in the competition of the various monasteries and convents. A unique court ensembles are the silverware of the Prince-Bishop of Hildesheim and the service and figurative centrepieces of Nymphenburg and Meissen porcelain manufacturers. Rare furnitures testify to the high rank of the most famous German cabinetmaker manufactories of the 18th Century.

The collection of Neo-classical art of the 19th Century is also strongly influenced by works that once belonged to the Wittelsbach family. Thus, from the estate of Maximilian's father King Ludwig I are magnificent presents of Napoleon Bonaparte which arrived at the Museum, a result of the strong connection between France and Bavaria. Of special importance is for example a splendid table with precious wood with a rich porcelain decor, a gift Napoleon gave in 1806 to the Crown Prince Ludwig. The Art Nouveau Department shows, for example, the floral art direction, an expression of Art Nouveau inspired by the plants and animals, first developed in France. The collection of fine glass and porcelain and ceramics includes many objects of high artistic and technical quality of the most important centers of this epoch in Europe and the United States. The museum displays a major collection of Art Nouveau objects, including the work of Louis Comfort Tiffany, René Lalique, Émile Gallé and several Bavarian artists.

=== Period rooms ===
Many of the museum's treasures are displayed in antique rooms moved to the museum. For example, the armor is in one of several rooms featuring gothic ribbed vaulting form medieval buildings, magnificent renaissance furnishings are displayed in rooms roofed with decorative wood-beamed and mullioned ceilings form the 14th and 15th centuries, and the baroque objects in rooms with 16th century wood paneling and decorative ceilings.

== Folklore collection ==
The folklore collection houses for example traditional Bavarian furnitures, rural pottery, crockery and religious folklore including an outstanding collection of Neapolitan, Sicilian, Tyrolian and Bavarian wood carvings including street scenes and Nativity Scenes.

=== Nativity scenes ===
The museum holds an extensive collection of Nativity scene from the fifteenth through early nineteenth centuries, dramatically and imaginatively displayed. Many of the scenes display wonderful craftsmanship and detailed workmanship, some are worked in precious materials, others show exotic elements, like a Flight into Egypt intended to astonish 18th century viewers with the monkeys, crocodiles and hippopotamuses Mary and Joseph encounter on the Nile.

== Gallery ==
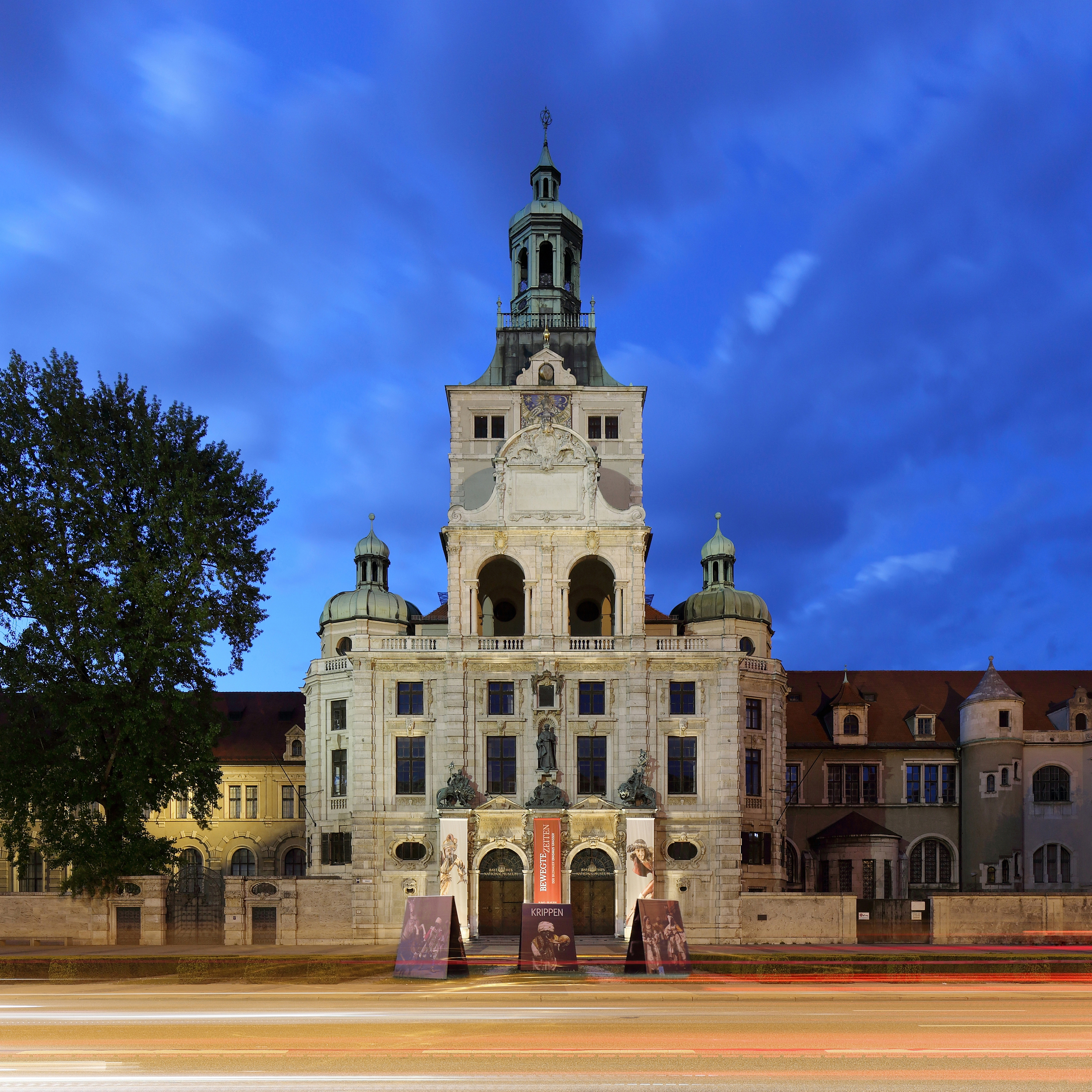
Main building at night

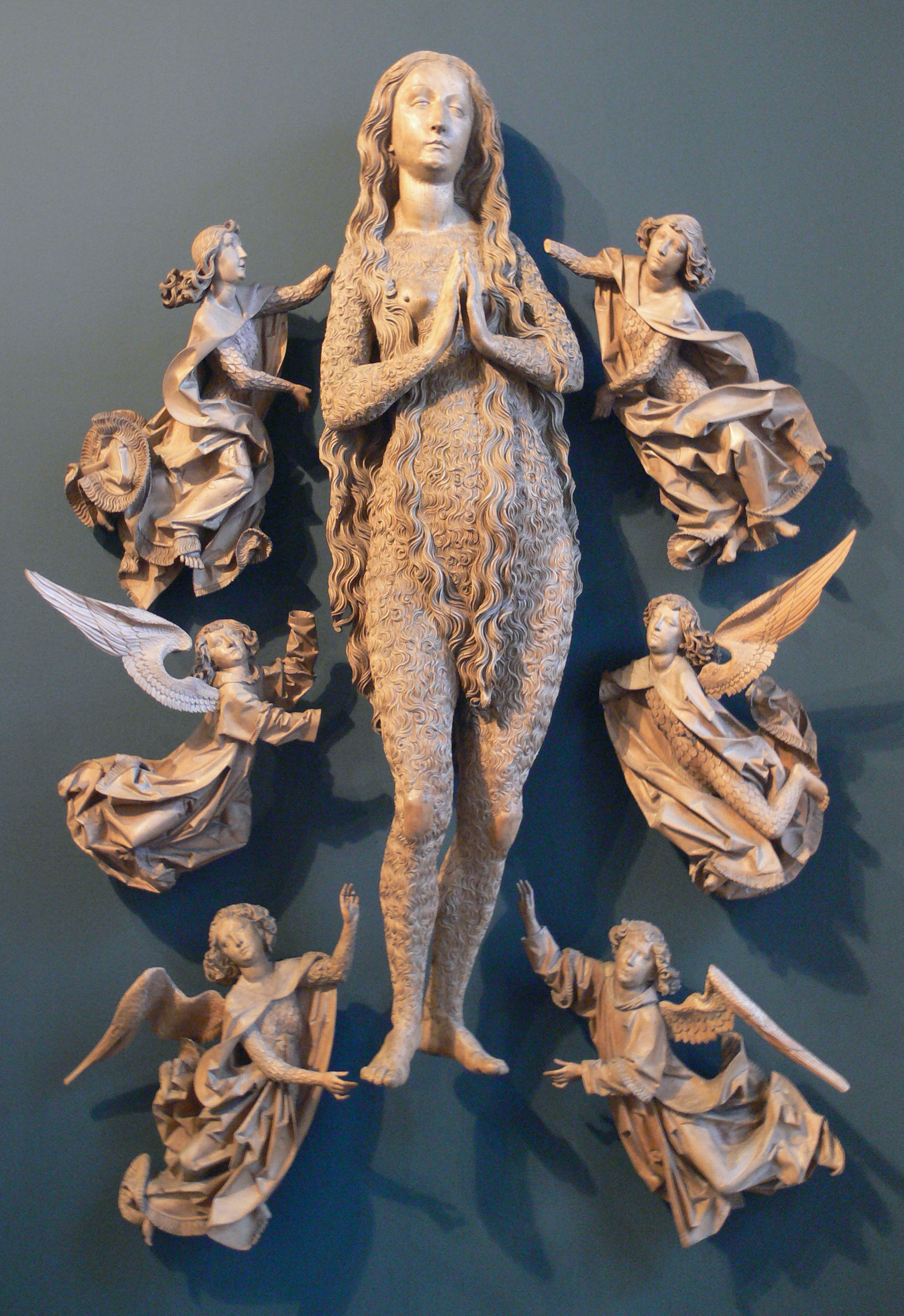
Tilman Riemenschneider: Mary Magdalene

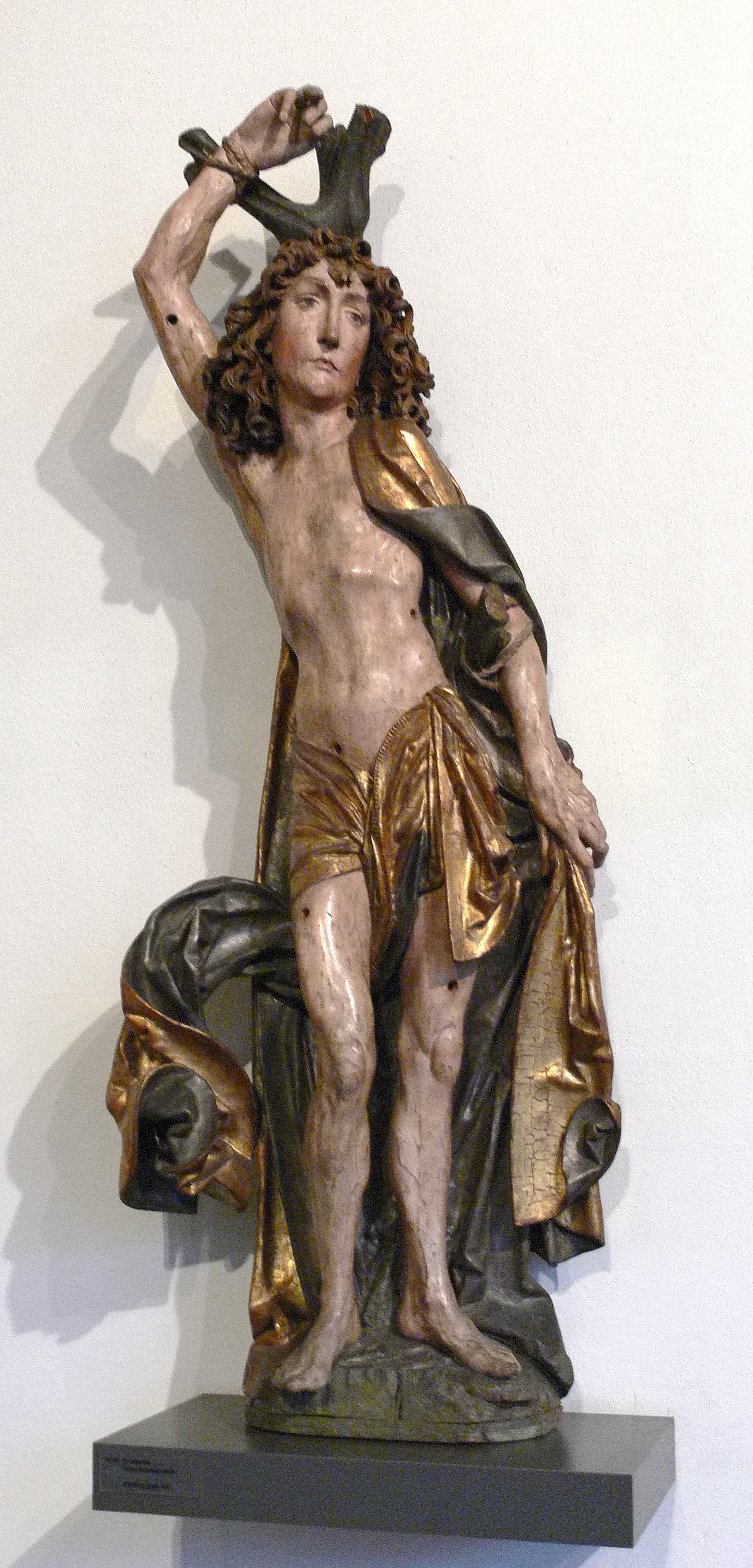
Tilman Riemenschneider: Saint Sebastian

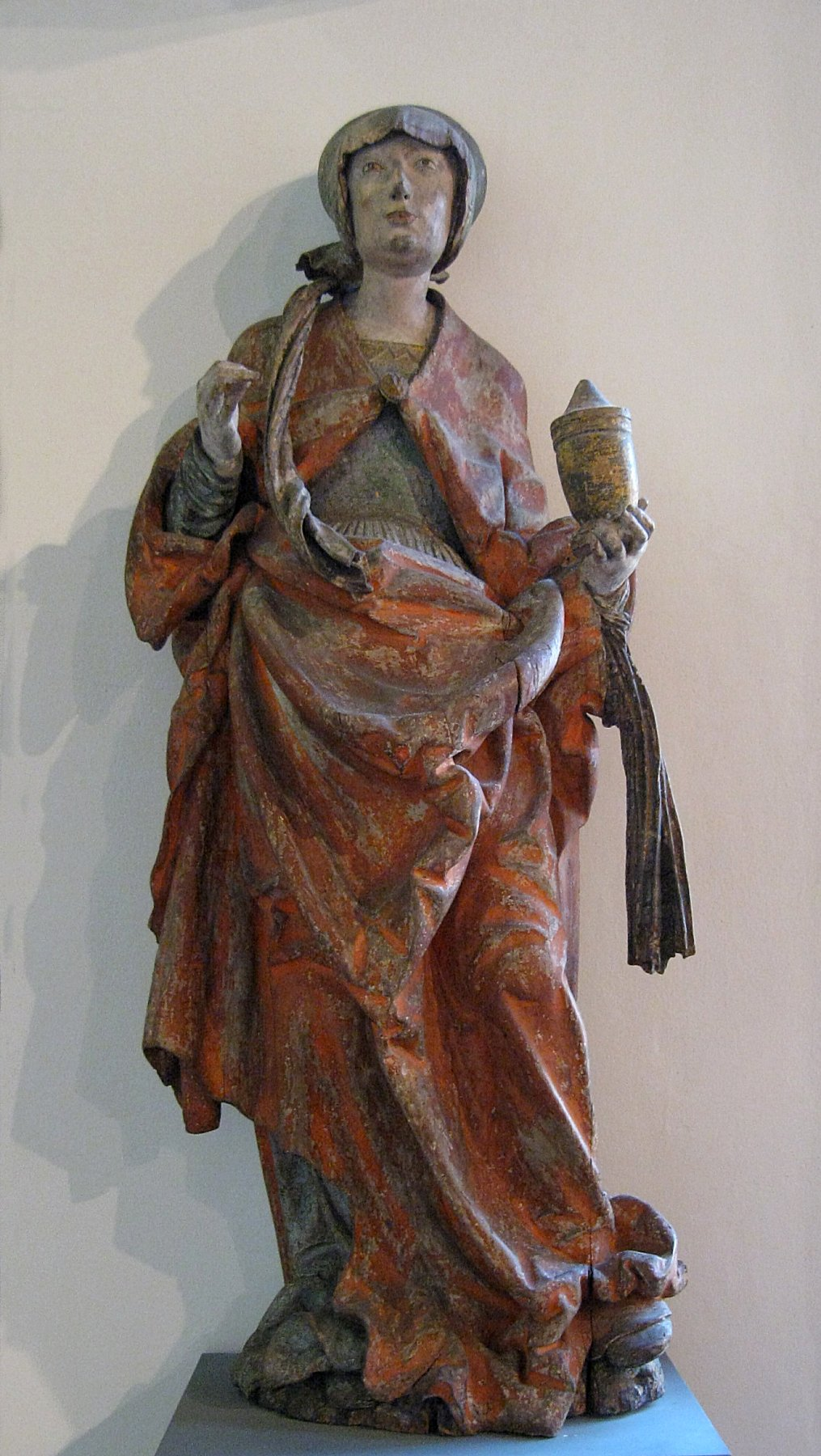
Hans Leinberger: St. Magdalena, about 1520

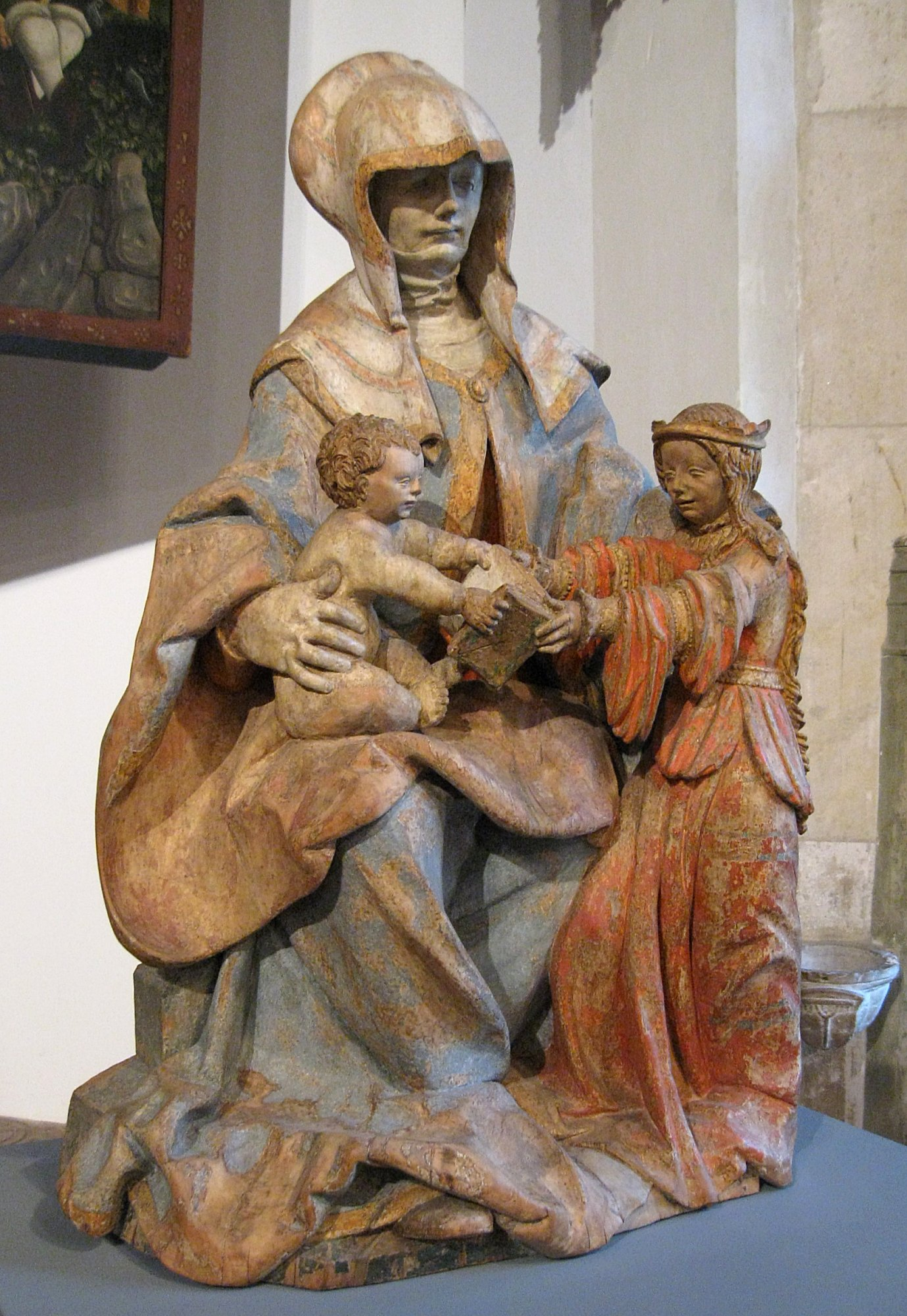
Hans Leinberger St. Anna Selbdritt

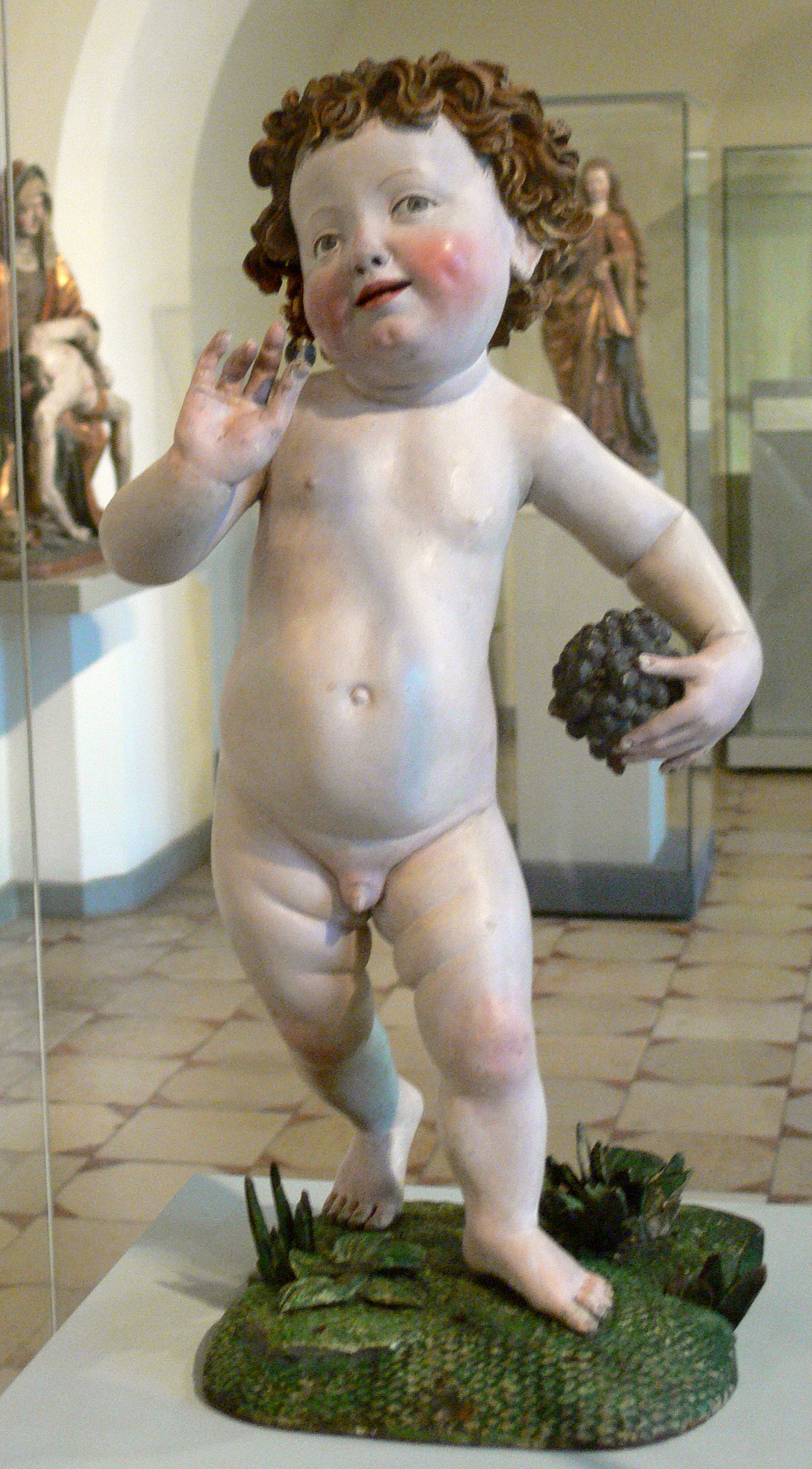
Niclaus Gerhaerts von Leyden: Jesus with grapes

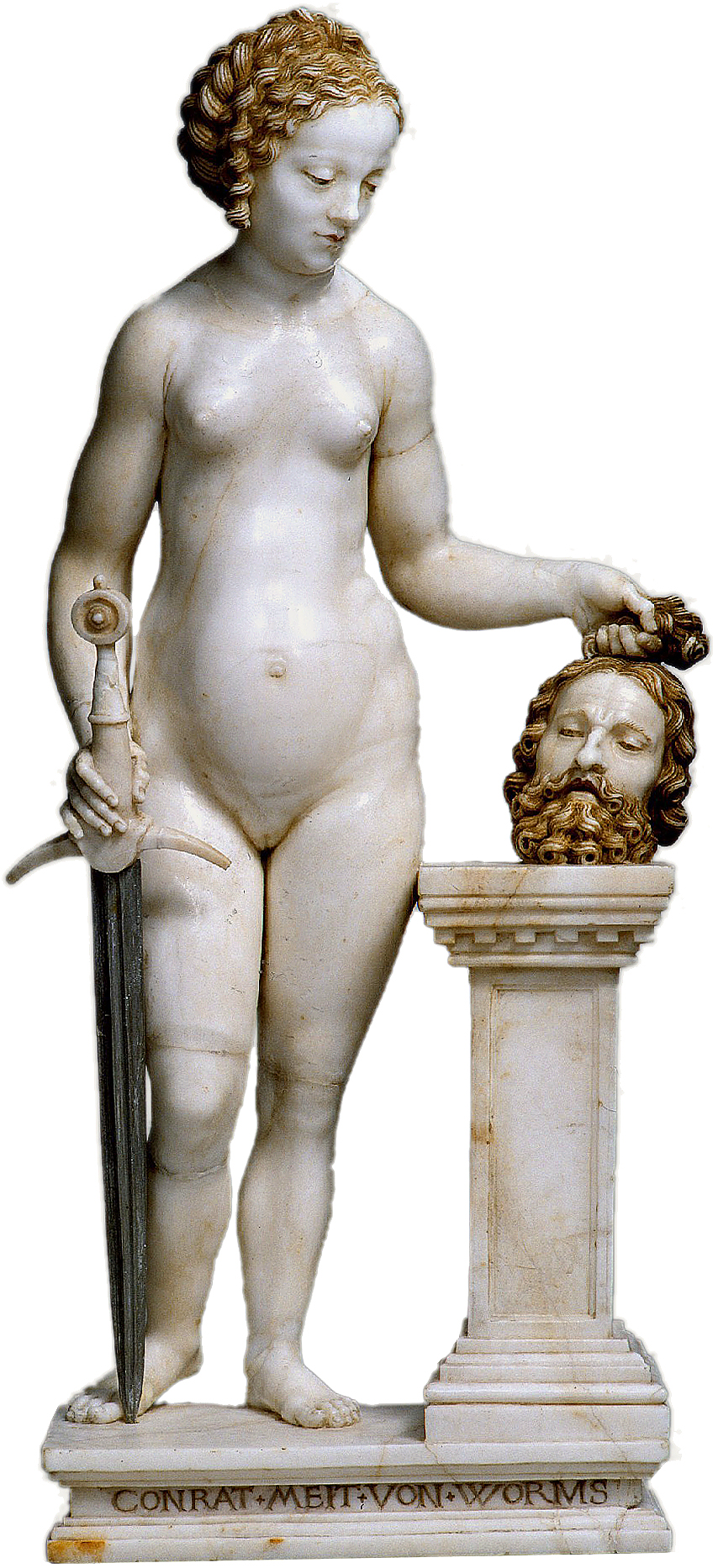
Conrat Meit: Judith with the head of Holofernes

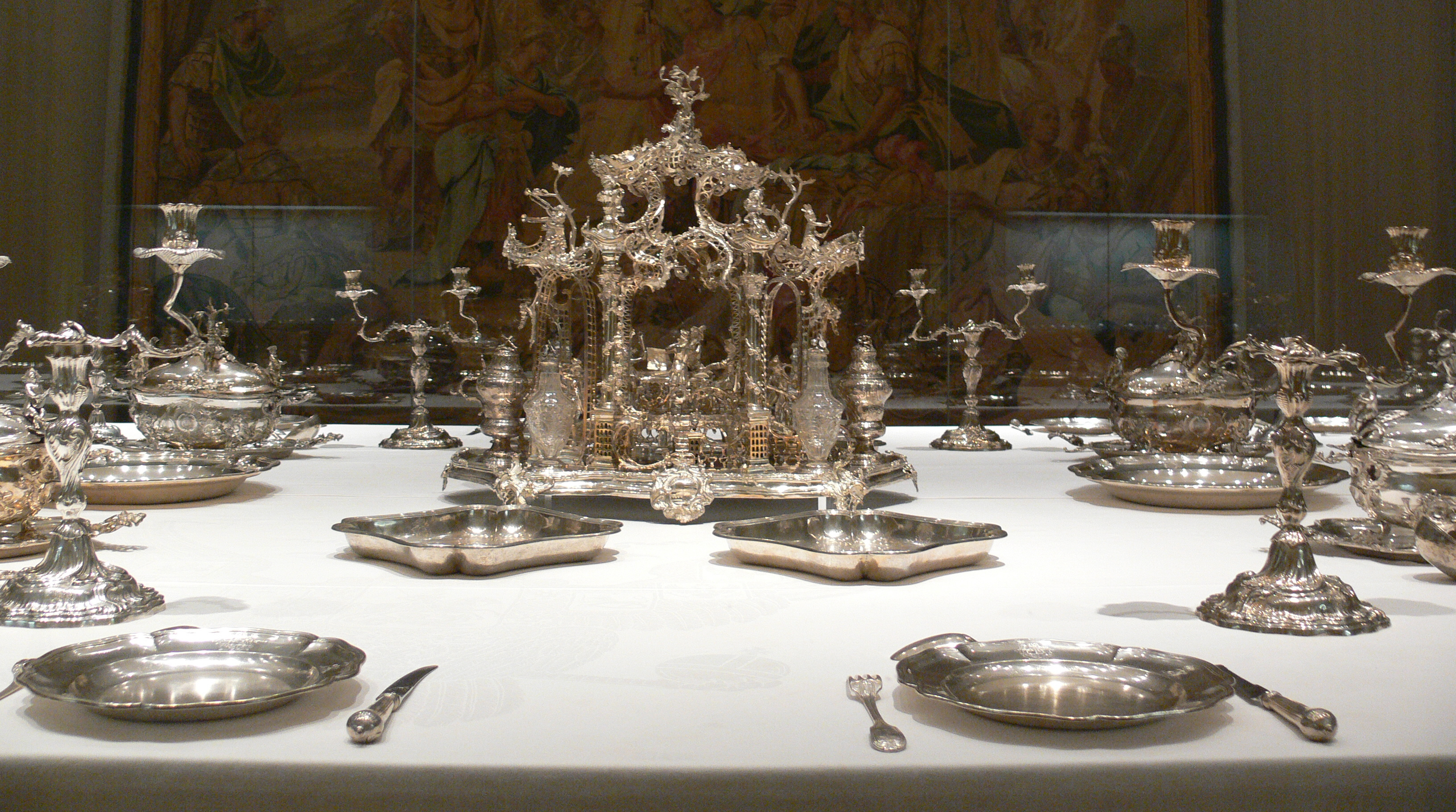
Silver table service from Augsburg of the Prince-Bishop of Hildesheim
