= Golden Madonna of Essen =

Gold-covered statue of the Virgin and Child in Essen Cathedral, Germany

Coordinates: 51°27′21″N 7°00′49″E

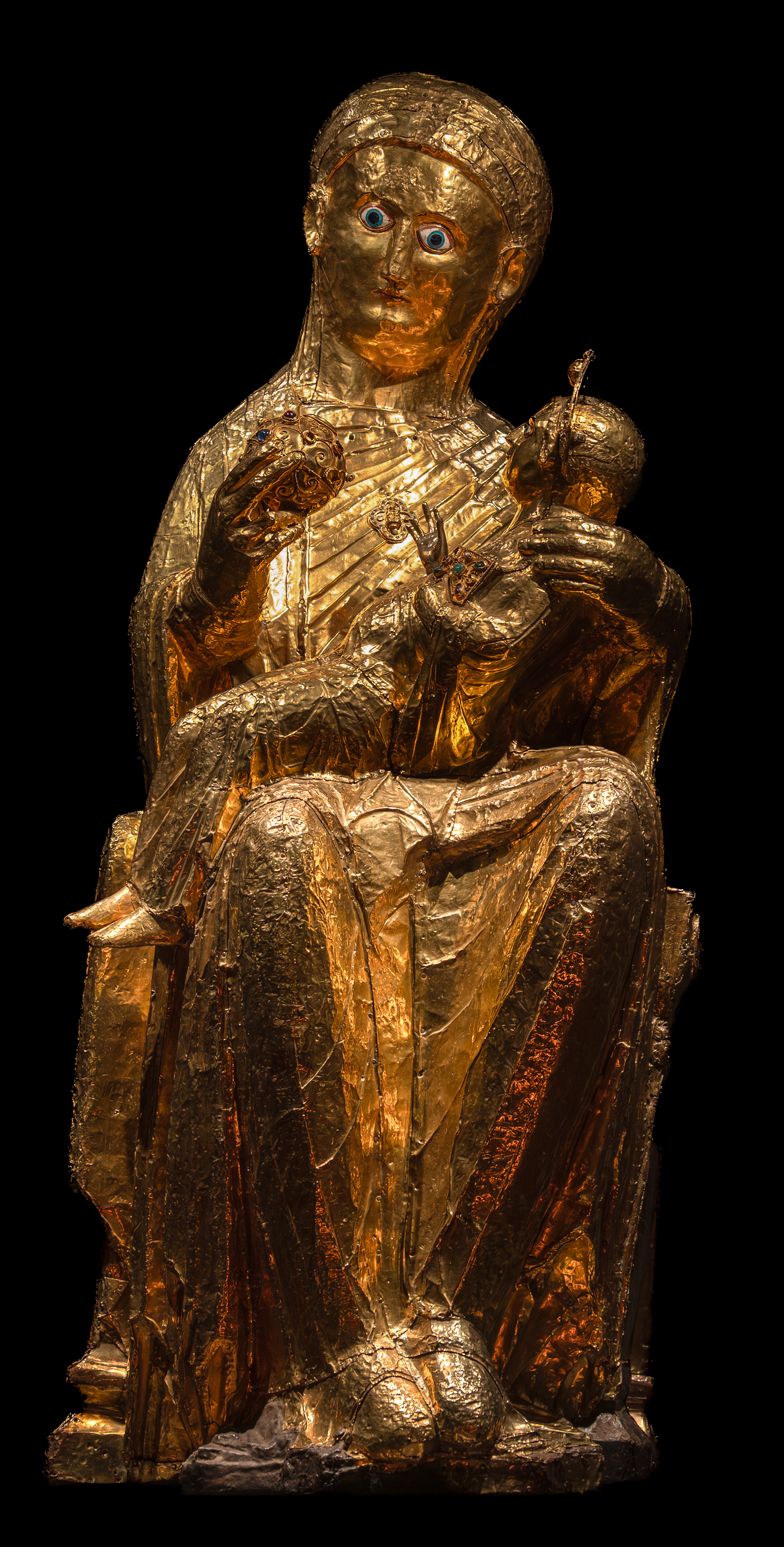
The Golden Madonna of Essen (c. 980)

The Golden Mother of Good Counsel of Essen (Latin: Mater Auream de Bonii Consilii in Essendiæ) is the eldest Roman Catholic sculpture of the Blessed Virgin Mary and the Child Jesus. The image is a wooden core covered with sheets of thin gold leaf and is part of the treasury of Essen Cathedral in Germany. The statue measures 74 centimetres (29 inches) in height; at the base it is 27 centimetres (10.6 inches) wide.

Dated around the year 980 A.D., it is both the oldest known sculpture of the Madonna and the oldest free-standing medieval sculpture north of the Alps, and is also one of the few major works of art to survive from Ottonian times. To this day it remains an object of veneration and symbol of identity for the population of the Ruhr Area. It is the only full-length survival from what appears to have been a common form of statue among the wealthiest churches and abbeys of 10th and 11th century Northern Europe.

Pope John XXIII issued a Pontifical decree titled Essendiæ in Urbe which named this image as Our Lady of Good Counsel and official Patroness of the Diocese of Essen on 8 July 1959. The decree was signed and notarized by the former Vatican Secretary of State, Cardinal Domenico Tardini.

== Artisanal dating ==
The statue is dated around the year 980 and was thus created during the tenure of Mathilde, a granddaughter of Emperor Otto I, as abbess of Essen Abbey. Under her reign and those of her successors Sophia of Gandersheim (1012–1039) and Theophanu (1039–1058), the abbey acquired what is today considered the most precious of the works of art of the Essen treasury. The creator of the sculpture is unknown, but it is generally presumed to have been crafted in either Cologne or Hildesheim. Hildesheim is home to a Madonna slightly younger than the one in Essen, while Cologne seems more likely as the home of the artist since the folds in the Madonna's gown resemble those of the Cross of Otto and Mathilde dated 982 which is also part of the Essen treasury but was doubtless created by a Cologne goldsmith as it shares many features with the Gero crucifix of Cologne Cathedral.

== Description ==
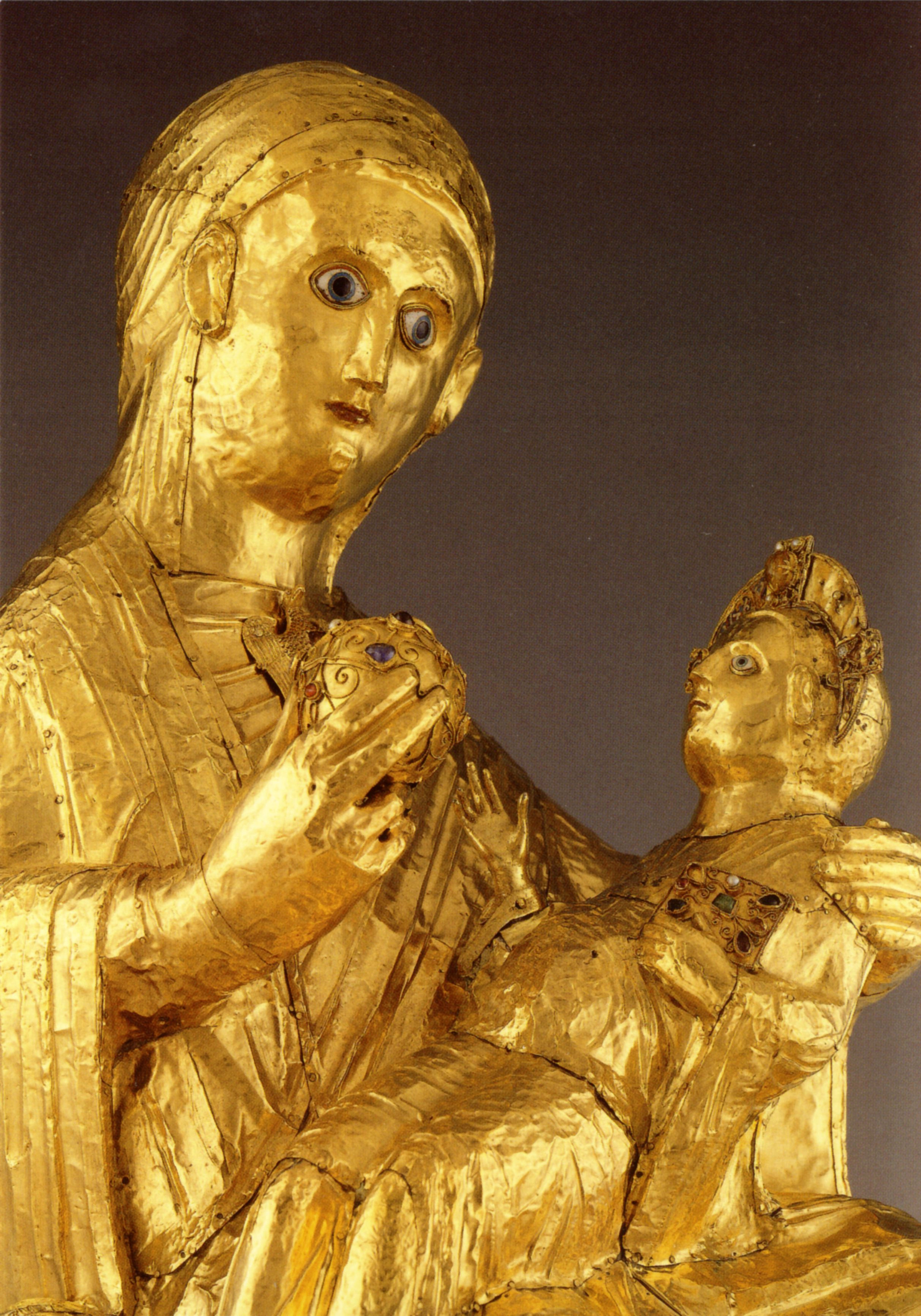
Closeup view of the Madonna with child

Mary is depicted sitting on a stool, with a slightly oversized Christ child figure sitting on her lap. She wears a tight, long-sleeved tunic and a cloak (palla) drawn over her shoulders. On her head she wears a veil, the ends of which are covered by the cloak. In her right hand she holds aloft a globe with her thumb and two fingers, while her left hand supports the infant in her lap. The Christ figure himself wears a pontifical gown and presses a book against his breast with his left hand.

The core of the sculpture was carved from a single piece of wood, most likely from a poplar tree, though earlier art historians have assumed it to be pear, plum or lime. The sculpture's surface is entirely covered with sheets of gold leaf less than 0.25 millimetres (0.01 in) thick, which are held in place by minute golden bolts. The size of the individual gold leaves varies to suit the surface texture. The faces of both mother and child are pounded out of one single leaf each. The coloured eyes of the figures are made of cloisonné enamel. While the eyes of the mother are inset into carved fittings, those of the child are merely pasted on the wooden core. The child's hand is made of cast silver and was added only in the 14th century; the original right hand is lost. There are traces of original tenth century adornments on the orb in the Virgin's right hand, on the right back leg of the stool, as well as on the child's book and halo. The agrafe showing an eagle and seemingly pinning Mary's cloak is an early thirteenth century addition; the fibula beneath has Gothic features and is dated to the fourteenth century.

=== Preservation efforts ===
The Madonna was first restored in 1905. By then the statue's core was riddled with woodworm tunnels and threatened to collapse. The restorers carefully wrapped the statue in a plaster cast, insufflated the cavities to remove bore dust, impregnated them with insecticides and finally filled them with a mixture of glue, chalk and water, turning the figure around repeatedly in the process so as to reach every nook and angle. The surface holes were then sealed with bolts of oak. The restoration cost a total of 3,200 Goldmarks, part of which was paid by the Prussian state.

During and after World War II the statue suffered from hasty evacuation transports; many gold leaves came loose and the wood was again infested with wood boring insects. A second restoration was undertaken by the Essen goldsmith Classen, who gassed the sculpture with pesticides and filled the bore holes with “liquid wood”, a plastic then commonly used in wood restorations.

The most recent restoration was undertaken on site in 2004. A workshop was installed in the cathedral's treasure chamber to examine the condition of the sculpture. X-rays and endoscopy were used to detect remaining cavities, and both wood from the core and the sooty film that had accreted on the gold leaves over the centuries were chemically analyzed. The experts recommended that the statue be kept in a steady climate and not exposed to agitation. Cologne wood restorers Ria Röthinger and Michaela von Welck consolidated the wood of the stool, silversmith Peter Bolg polished the metal leaves of the coating and the child's right silver arm which had tarnished black over the years. The restoration was overseen by a commission of art historians and restorers led by Dr. Brigitta Falk, curator of the Essen treasury. The Madonna was returned to its habitual place in the cathedral in December 2004. A detailed restoration report is due to appear in an anthology in 2007 along with further research papers on the statue and Essen Abbey.

== History ==
=== Medieval mentions ===
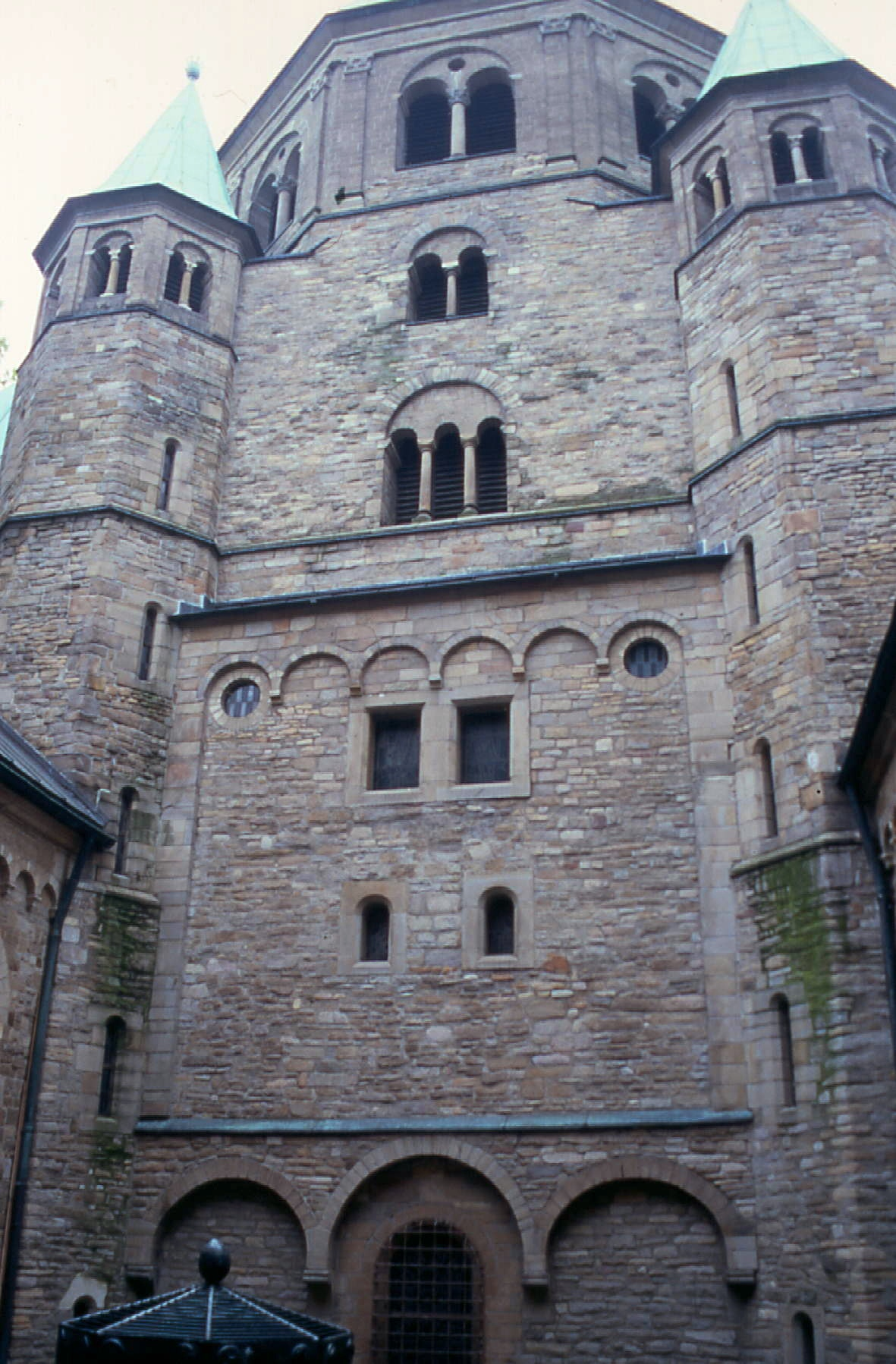
The Ottonian westwork of Essen Cathedral

Whether and exactly when the statue was commissioned, acquired or donated is unknown, and documents referring to the Madonna are scarce for the first couple of centuries of its existence. It seems certain that it was part of the cathedral treasure by 993, when Emperor Otto III paid the abbey a visit and donated a crown, the so-called “child’s crown”, which is also part of the treasure to this day. Since this first mention the Madonna has always been in the cathedral save in wartime. Apparently the bitter conflict between the diocese of Cologne and the Lords of Isenberg over control of Essen Abbey that resulted in the murder of Archbishop Engelbert at the hands of Friedrich von Isenberg in 1225 did not affect the sculpture, nor did the centuries-long quarrel over whether the city of Essen was legally a free imperial city or rather a dependency of the abbey.

The seal of the city of Essen of 1244 shows the Madonna between Saints Cosmas and Damian. The first documented mention of the Madonna is from the 1370 Liber Ordinarius, which details a fully developed liturgy and processions centred around the statue. The fact that the canon received the Madonna from the hands of the treasuress for processions on Purification leads historians to assume that the sculpture was shown exclusively during processions and was stored out of public sight for the rest of the year. Suggested repositories include the fortress-like westwork of the cathedral and the armarium dictum sychter, an annex to the south nave.

The sculpture has been known by its current name Golden Madonna only since the 19th century. A liturgical manuscript dating from around 1370 simply describes it as "dat gulden bild onser vrouwen" (literally “the golden image of Our Lady”). The 1626 treasure inventory of Essen Abbey lists Noch ein gross Marienbelt, sitzend uff einen sthuell mit lauteren golt uberzogen ("[A]nother image of Mary, sitting on a chair and covered with pure gold").

=== Evacuations in early modern times ===
The Thirty Years' War necessitated the first evacuation of the sculpture. In 1634 the then abbess of Essen, Maria Clara von Spaur, Pflaum und Valör, sought shelter in Cologne and took the cathedral treasure with her. It would remain there until the end of the war in 1648. In these years the Madonna and the now lost Marsus shrine of the Essen treasure were paraded in processions, outshining the treasures of Cologne's cathedral, as the annals of Essen Abbey proudly claim.

The second evacuation was in 1794 before the advance of the French revolutionary army. It was hidden in the orphanage of the nearby town of Steele. Essen Abbey ceased to exist in 1803 following the secularization of ecclesiastical principalities under the Reichsdeputationshauptschluss. Ownership of the Madonna passed to the Roman Catholic parish of St. Johannes, which used the former abbey church as its parish church. Throughout the 19th century the sculpture mostly remained locked away in the treasury and was hardly ever examined by art historians.

=== 20th century ===
The Madonna remained in Essen throughout World War I but was again evacuated in its aftermath. After the communist revolt in the Ruhr area in the spring of 1920, the authorities of St. Johannes parish, fearing another uprising, decided to hide the statue in a safe place that would be unknown even to its own priest so as to prevent discovery by treason or extortion. A goldsmith from Aachen was assigned to find a hiding place, and he finally negotiated with another German diocese that the Madonna and the rest of the Essen treasure was to be concealed in a place that only the goldsmith and a designated guardian would know about: even the bishop was only informed about the general plan, but not about the exact location of the sanctuary. A document detailing the whereabouts was deposited in a Dutch diocese in case the middleman was killed. The plan worked so well that to this day it is unknown where exactly the treasure was hidden at that time. The only certainty is that it was packed in shabby cardboard suitcases and taken to some place in the Diocese of Hildesheim. The voucher deposited in the Netherlands was destroyed after the treasure was finally brought back to Essen in 1925 when the political situation seemed stable. In the summer of 1925 the goldsmith from Aachen and his son retrieved the treasure from its sanctuary and brought it back to Essen, travelling in a fourth-class Reichsbahn carriage and carrying the treasure inconspicuously as hand luggage.

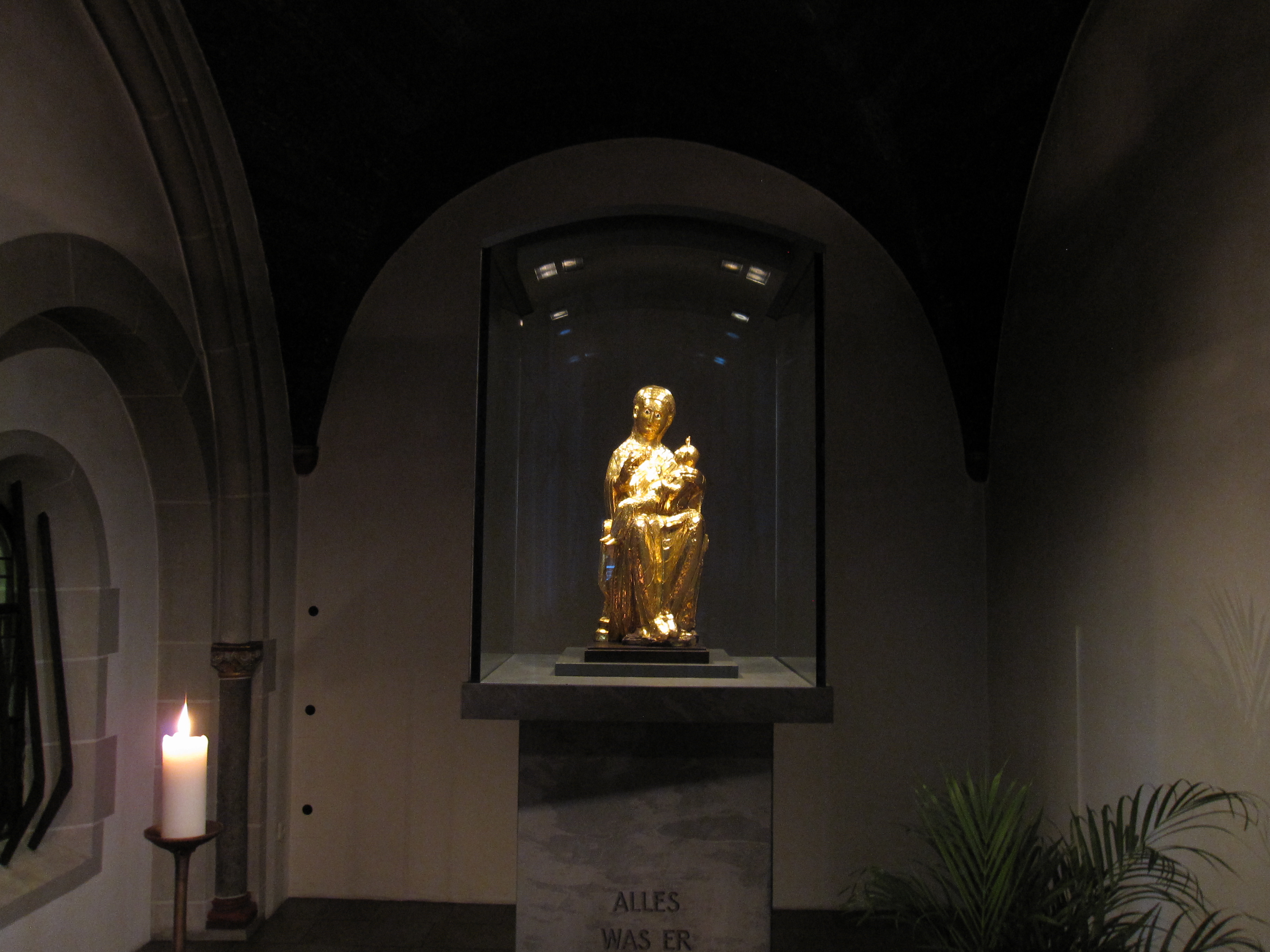
The Golden Madonna is kept in a side-chapel of Essen Cathedral

During World War II the Essen treasure was first evacuated to Warstein, then to Schloss Albrechtsburg in Saxony and finally moved to an air-raid shelter in Siegen, where it was discovered by American troops by the end of the war. Because the treasury in Essen had been destroyed by air raids, the Madonna could not return to its natural place until the 1950s. It was first brought to the Hessian State Museum in Marburg, then to Schloss Dyck near Rheydt. From April to June 1949 it was shown in an exhibition in Brussels, then through October in Amsterdam, and finally returned to Essen. Until the reconstruction of Essen Cathedral was completed the treasure was stored in the vault of Essen's savings bank. The Madonna has not left the city since.

== Iconography ==
=== Influences ===
The Golden Madonna is both the oldest known sculpture of the Madonna and the oldest free-standing sculpture north of the Alps. It is also one of only two extant medieval gilded cult images. Gilded sculptures are frequently mentioned in medieval documents, but apart from an image of Saint Fides in the abbey of Saint-Foy in Conques in Southern France not many of those artifacts survive. We know Charlemagne had a life-size crucifix with the figure of Christ in gold in his Palatine Chapel in Aachen, the oldest such object to be described, and many similar figures in precious metal, all now vanished, are recorded in large Anglo-Saxon churches and elsewhere. Most often they are crucifixes, and sometimes accompanying figures of Mary and John the Evangelist are mentioned, as for example those by Spearhafoc in the 11th century.

The fact that the Essen statue is free-standing and its enamel eyes point to the influence of Byzantine art and its spreading to the Holy Roman Empire after the marriage of Emperor Otto II with the Byzantine princess Theophanu in 972, although statues on this large scale were completely outside Byzantine traditions after the Byzantine iconoclasm. The overall form of the Madonna indicates that the sculptor was not experienced in carving free-standing sculptures, since profile, front and rear view do not match up to a harmonic whole.

=== Religious and political significance ===
Like many medieval works of art, the Madonna displays a very complex iconography. The statue shows the Virgin in a rather plain gown, while the oversized Christ child figure in her lap wears a precious pontifical gown. The size is meant to illustrate the importance of Christ as redeemer. In contrast Mary is depicted in a serving role, in accordance with Luke 1:38: And Mary said, Behold the handmaid of the Lord; be it unto me according to thy word. At the same time she embodies the Seat of Wisdom as the Throne of Solomon is described in 1 Kings 10:18: Moreover the king made a great throne of ivory, and overlaid it with the best gold. Sitting on her lap is the Christ child, whose ornate chasuble betokens his significance as ruler of the heavens, the book his role as herald of the faith. Bearing in mind other medieval portrayals of Christ as teacher, it may be supposed that the child's lost right arm was originally raised in a gesture of blessing. However, Christ's face is turned towards his mother, while from any position Mary's look seems directed towards the beholder. Thus Mary may arguably not only be interpreted as a passive devotee but also assumes the role of mediator between the people and the Redeemer.

There are several possible interpretations for the orb Mary is holding in her right hand. It has been construed as the globus cruciger of the Holy Roman Empire. However, a globus cruciger is not attested as part of the Holy Roman regalia until the coronation of Conrad II in 1024, and besides in the habitual depiction of the globus cruciger the orb is always shown held by the full hand and all fingers, not just three.

It is therefore safer to interpret the orb as an "apple of salvation" —in much the same way as Eve held the apple of damnation plucked from the Tree of Knowledge of Good and Evil, Mary now proffers the beholder an apple symbolizing the redemption she has brought to the world by incarnating Christ. She thus appears as "the New Eve".

Another interpretation of the orb is akin to the globus-cruciger theory. While such an object may not have been part of the coronation ceremony of the Holy Roman Empire until the next century, the idea of an orb symbolizing power over the Mundus, i.e. the world, was well known by the time the sculpture was crafted. Depictions of this symbol of power can be found in Carolingian and Ottonian illuminated manuscripts. According to this theory then, Mary is holding the whole world in her hands, and she is holding it on behalf of the one who is in fact its sovereign, i.e. the infant in her lap.

The image of a mother holding the power over the world for her son may have had far-reaching political implications at the time of the sculpture's creation. Emperor Otto II, uncle to Mathilde, the then abbess of Essen, died in 983 in Rome, leaving as heir to the throne only his son Otto, a child of three years. Until her death in 991, Otto's mother Theophanu served as regent for her underage son and defended his title against the claims of Henry the Quarrelsome, formerly Duke of Bavaria and male next of kin to Otto. The Madonna could thus be construed as an expression of Theophanu's insistence on being, by the Grace of God, the rightful sovereign of the Empire until her son would be of age. Consequently, it may be inferred that Theophanu in fact donated the sculpture to Essen Abbey. In the struggle for the throne, Mathilde most probably took the side of Otto and Theophanu. Mathilde's family line had a long history of rivalry to Henry's, and she was the personal heiress to her brother Otto (d. 982), who in 976 had been granted the Dukedom of Bavaria after Henry's revolt. This would further suggest that the eventual Emperor Otto III may have donated the “Child’s crown” of the treasury on his visit to the abbey out of gratitude for its loyalty in the power struggle that took place when he was a mere child.

== Liturgical significance, past and present ==
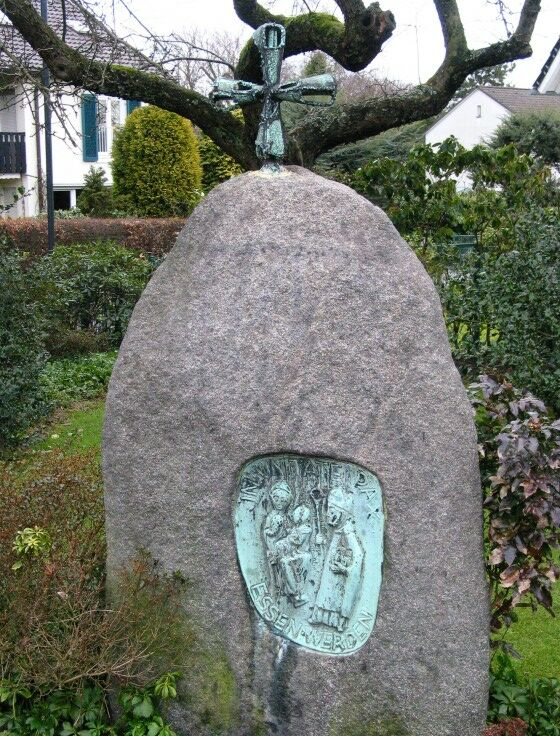
Memorial cross in Essen-Bredeney showing the Golden Madonna

The Golden Madonna has always held a special place in the liturgy of Essen Abbey. From her creation she seems to have been normally kept in the Treasury, and only brought out for major feast-days and other special occasions. She was paraded in all major processions, and the altar dedicated to Mary in the cathedral was the place where deeds of donation to the religious community were received and deposited, thus putting them under the symbolic custody of the Virgin. It is however uncertain whether it was in fact the Golden Madonna who presided over these deeds, since the abbey inventories list two other Mary figures besides the golden one.

The most important procession took place on the day of the Purification of the Virgin 40 days after Christmas. In a steady ritual, the treasuress handed over the sculpture to the youngest canon of the parish on the eve of the procession, who then concealed it under his cloak and brought it to St. Gertrude's church in the City of Essen, today known as the Marktkirche (Market Church). On the following morning the statue was veiled and carried in a solemn procession back to the cathedral, where it was laid down on the steyn, the "stone" where offerings to the abbey were usually placed. There she was ceremonially unveiled and crowned with Otto's child crown. The crowned Madonna was then carried back into the minster under the eyes of the congregation, just as Mary had been welcomed by the people of the Heavenly Jerusalem upon her arrival there according to the scripture. The Purification processions ceased in 1561 when the Protestant Reformation reached the city of Essen – though not the abbey –, and the parish of St. Gertrude was converted to the Lutheran faith. The medieval tradition of the coronation of Mary was revived in 1978 by Essen's first bishop Cardinal Franz Hengsbach but had to be stopped in 2000 due to the restorer's concerns.

Another procession in which the Madonna was shown took place every year on the Monday preceding Ascension Day. On this day the nuns, canons and scholars of the abbey and its daughter house in nearby Rellinghausen held a formal meeting with the monks of Werden Abbey and took the Golden Madonna along. The two processions met about halfway between the two monasteries at a chapel dedicated to Saint Mark in what is today the neighbourhood of Essen-Bredeney. A memorial cross commemorates the place of these meetings today.

When the Diocese of Essen (the so-called Ruhrbistum) was established in 1959, Mary was elected as its patron saint under the title “Mother of Good Counsel”, and thus came to be a symbol for the whole Ruhr area. The first bishop of Essen, Cardinal Franz Hengsbach, decided to make the statue accessible to the public. Since 1959 the Madonna has been on display in a climate-controlled high-security showcase in the northern side chapel of the cathedral.

== See also ==
- Cross of Mathilde
- Roman Catholic Marian art
- Seat of Wisdom
- The Golden Virgin

== Sources ==
- Falk, Brigitta. “„ein Mutter gottesbild mit gold plattirt“ – Zum Erhaltungszustand der Goldenen Madonna des Essener Doms.” Alfred Pothmann – Hüter und Bewahrer – Forscher und Erzähler – Gedenkschrift. Essen 2003, ISBN 3-00-012328-8
- Fehrenbach, Frank. Die goldene Madonna im Essener Münster. edition tertius, Ostfildern 1996, ISBN 3-930717-23-9
- Gerchow, Jan. “Der Schatz des Essener Frauenstifts bis zum 15. Jahrhundert. Zur Geschichte der Institution.” Alfred Pothmann – Hüter und Bewahrer – Forscher und Erzähler – Gedenkschrift. Essen 2003, ISBN 3-00-012328-8
- Hlawitschka, Eduard. “Kaiserinnen Adelheit und Theophanu.” Frauen des Mittelalters in Lebensbildern. Styria Verlag, Graz 1997.
- Humann, Georg. Die Kunstwerke der Münsterkirche zu Essen. Düsseldorf 1904.
- Konnegen, Lydia. “Verborgene Schätze. Der Essener Münsterschatz in Zeiten des Ruhrkampfes.” Münster am Hellweg. Mitteilungsblatt d. Vereins für die Erhaltung des Essener Münsters. Essen 2005, S. 67ff.
- Leonard Küppers, Paul Mikat: Der Essener Münsterschatz. Fredebeul & Koenen, Essen 1966.
- Pothmann, Alfred. “Der Essener Kirchenschatz aus der Frühzeit der Stiftsgeschichte.” Herrschaft, Bildung und Gebet – Gründung und Anfänge des Frauenstifts Essen. Klartext, Essen 2000, ISBN 3-88474-907-2
