= Otto I of Swabia and Bavaria =

Duke of Swabia (973–982) and Bavaria (976–982)

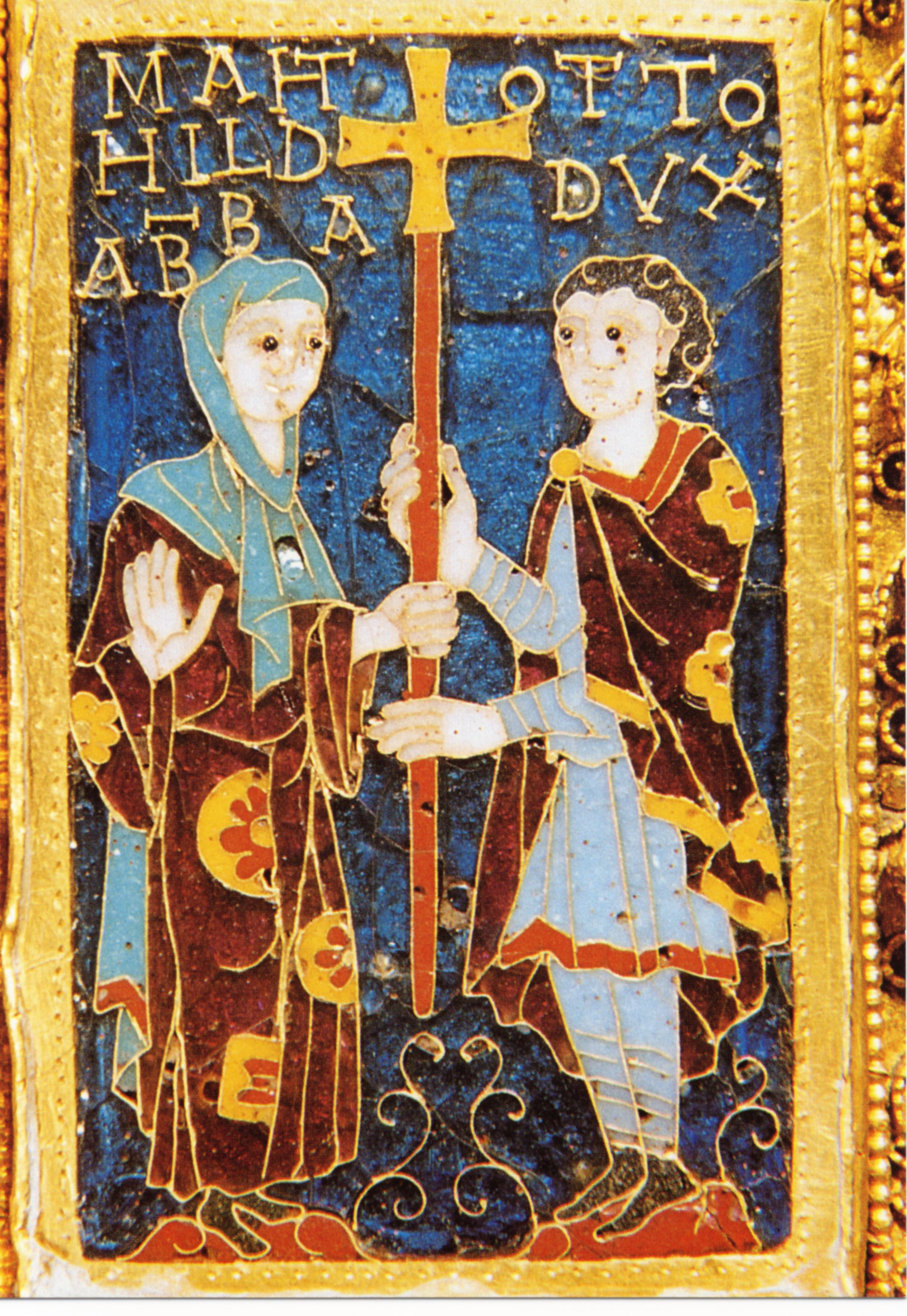
Duke Otto (Otto dux) and his sister, abbess Mathilde (Mahthild abba), a detail on the Cross of Otto and Mathilde

Otto I (born 954, died 31 October or 1 November 982) was the Duke of Swabia from 973 and Duke of Bavaria from 976. He was a member of the Ottonian dynasty, the only son of Duke Liudolf of Swabia and his wife Ida, and thus a grandson of the Emperor Otto I and his Anglo-Saxon wife Eadgyth. His sister Mathilde was the abbess of Essen Abbey.

Otto was only three years old when his father died in 957. He was raised at the court of his grandfather, Otto I, who seems to have adopted him and raised him alongside his own son, the future Emperor Otto II, born late in 955. The latter regarded him as both "nephew and brother" (nepos ac frater). When the childless Duke Burchard III of Swabia died in 973, Otto II transferred the Swabian duchy to his nineteen-year-old nephew and brother, whose father had been Burchard's predecessor. The elder Otto became a close confidante of his younger sovereign.

In 976 the imprisoned Duke Henry the Wrangler of Bavaria was formally dismissed from office for rebellion. In his place the emperor appointed Otto of Swabia, who became the first ruler of two duchies in medieval Germany. The Duchy of Carinthia and the March of the Nordgau were also taken from Henry, but were not bestowed on Otto, thus their history is separate from that of Bavaria from this point on. In 977, while the emperor was campaigning elsewhere, Otto helped crush the revolt of the Three Henries—the deposed duke of Bavaria, Bishop Henry I of Augsburg and Duke Henry I of Carinthia—by successfully besieging the leaders in Passau. The army of Bavarians that was ambushed by Boleslaus I of Bohemia near Plzeň while on its way to join the emperor at this time may have been sent by Duke Otto.

In 980 Otto accompanied the emperor on his south Italian campaign, fighting both the Byzantines and the Sicilian Arabs. He survived the defeat near Crotone on 13/14 July 982 and a subsequent ambush by an Arab force. Assigned to take the news of the campaign back to Germany, he died en route, of wounds received in battle, either 31 October or 1 November, at Lucca. His father had also died south of the Alps. His family brought his body back and had it buried in the collegiate church of Saints Peter and Alexander at Aschaffenburg, which Otto had generously endowed. His death is noted in the contemporary Abingdon version of the Anglo-Saxon Chronicle: "And then, as he went home, his [the emperor's] brother's son, who was called Otto, died; and he was the son of the aetheling Liudolf, and this Liudolf was son of Otto the Elder and King Edward's daughter".

Otto's sister Mathilde endowed a precious crux gemmata (jewelled cross), the Cross of Otto and Mathilde, which is kept in the Essen Cathedral Treasury; the siblings are pictured on it. Otto never married and left no children.

== Sources ==
- Duckett, Eleanor Shipley (1967). Death and Life in the Tenth Century. Ann Arbor: University of Michigan Press.
- Stälin, Paul Friedrich von (1886). "Otto I., Herzog von Schwaben und von Baiern". Allgemeine Deutsche Biographie. Vol. 24. Historischen Kommission bei der Bayerischen Akademie der Wissenschaften. pp. 725–26.
- Swanton, Michael James (1998). The Anglo-Saxon Chronicle. New York: Routledge.
- Whitbread, L. (1959). "Æthelweard and the Anglo-Saxon Chronicle". The English Historical Review. 74 (293): 577–89. doi:10.1093/ehr/lxxiv.293.577.
- Zotz, Thomas (1998). "Otto I.". Neue Deutsche Biographie. Vol. 19. pp. 694–95.

Otto I of Swabia and Bavaria House of Saxony (Liudolfing) Died: 982
Regnal titles
Preceded by Burchard III	Duke of Swabia; 973–982	Succeeded by Conrad I
Preceded by Henry II	Duke of Bavaria; 976–982	Succeeded by Henry III
