= Suanhild of Essen =

Abbess of Essen Abbey (died July 30, 1085)

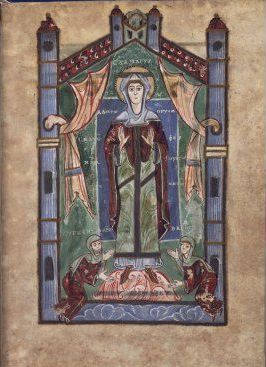
The donor image (p.17r) of the Svanhild Gospels. Suanhild and the Provost of Essen, Brigida, present the book to the standing Virgin Mary. The donors are labelled by name to convey their memory, but the figures do not bear any individual features.

Suanhild (died 30 July 1085 in Essen), also spelt Swanhild, Svanhild, or Schwanhild, was abbess of Essen Abbey from 1058 until her death. She oversaw the construction of a church and contributed works of art to the Essen Cathedral treasury. In 1073, Suanhild donated the collegiate church of Essen-Stoppenberg as a parish chapel. She also added a reliquary containing the arm of St. Basil to the cathedral treasury.

== Life ==
Few written 11th century sources document Suanhild’s life, however historians have constructed an approximate timeline of her life. She is first mentioned as a witness in the undated will of Theophanu (abbess from 1039 to 1058), likely her predecessor. Her birthdate is unknown, but as the canonical minimum age for becoming an abbess was 30, she was likely born before 1028 if she directly succeeded Theophanu. Details of Suanhild’s entry into Essen Abbey and her family background are undocumented. Although she owned estates, the prior ownership is unclear, preventing attribution to a specific noble family. Claims linking her to the Counts of Hückeswagen, based on an unreliable early modern catalogue of Essen abbesses, are dubious, as the Hückeswagen family was first documented in 1133.

In Theophanu’s will, Suanhild is listed among the canonesses without holding an office such as provost or deaconess, though such roles were not required to become abbess. Her abbacy is confirmed in 1073 by a document from the Archdiocese of Cologne, which records privileges granted by Archbishop Anno II for the church in Essen-Stoppenberg, founded by Suanhild and consecrated by Anno.

In May–June 1085, Suanhild sought confirmation and protection from Henry IV, Holy Roman Emperor, at a synod in Mainz for her donation of hereditary estates—Geißern (near Wachtendonk), Vuedereke, and Hukengesuuage (location unknown)—to Essen Abbey. The document, though bearing an execution mark, lacks a seal and date, suggesting it was a draft. The mark may have been added later to deter claims by Suanhild’s relatives, as the donation was enacted, the Wachtendonk property remained with the abbey until its dissolution in 1803. While some speculate the document is a post-mortem forgery, its incompleteness supports the draft theory.

According to the Essen obituary, Suanhild died on 30 July 1085 and was buried before the main altar in the crypt of Essen Cathedral, possibly in a raised tomb above the grave of the notable abbess Mathilde.

== Works ==
=== Collegiate church of Stoppenberg ===
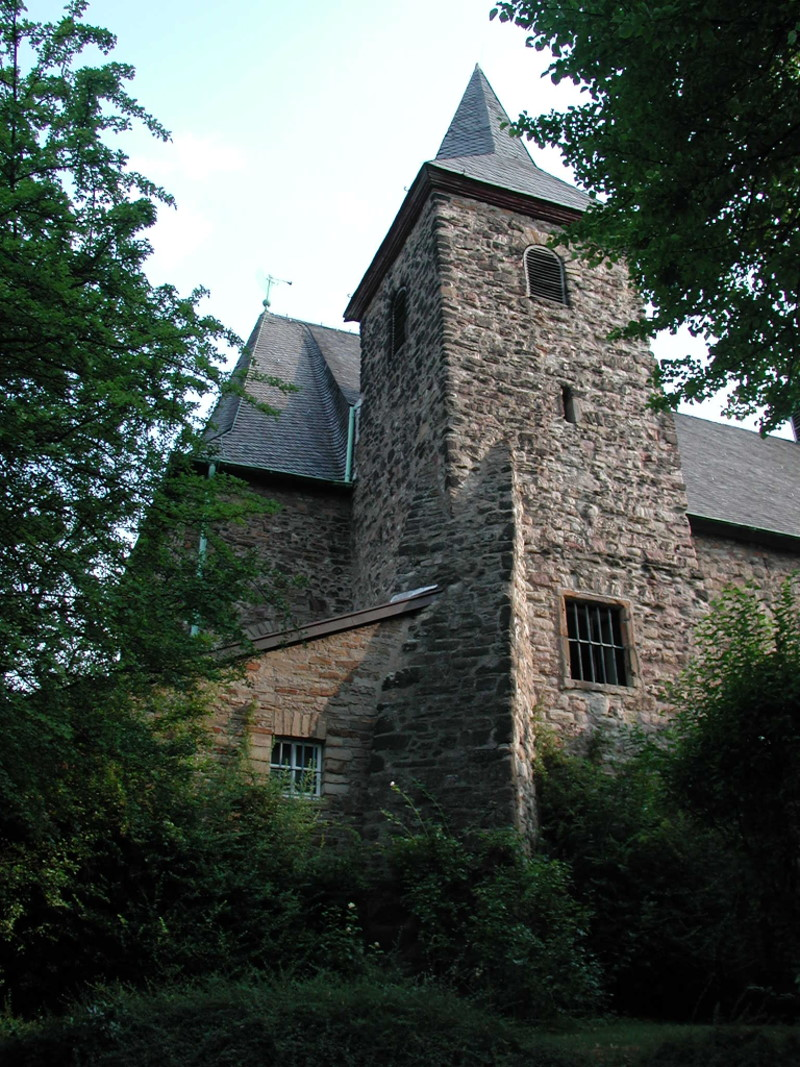
The collegiate church in Stoppenberg goes back to a foundation by Suanhild.

In the 11th century, the journey from Stoppenberg, now an Essen district, to Essen Cathedral was over an hour’s walk, particularly arduous for peasants under Essen Abbey’s authority, especially in winter. To address their tendency to avoid church, Suanhild funded a parish chapel in Stoppenberg using her resources. Consecrated on 29 January 1073 by Archbishop Anno II of Cologne, the chapel is a three-nave pillar basilica with a square choir, dedicated to Saint Nicholas. At Suanhild’s request, Anno granted privileges allowing residents to receive sacraments and hold funeral services in times of need. In the 12th century, the chapel became the monastery church of a Premonstratensian monastery, hence its designation as a collegiate church.

=== Basilius arm reliquary ===
Suanhild is credited with donating a 46 cm arm reliquary to the Essen Cathedral treasury, carved from oak in the shape of a right forearm, covered with silver and gold-plated copper. As Saint Basil was a patron saint of the Stoppenberg church, and the reliquary was annually transferred there during the Middle Ages, its attribution to Suanhild is widely accepted. The reliquary’s design suggests modest craftsmanship, the hand’s middle section is disproportionately short, and the finger plates are pieced together, though the arm’s sleeves, with imitated fabric folds, are better executed. Riveted metal strips on the sleeves display a diamond pattern with leaf ornaments and a vine pattern with the inscription “† Serve Dei Vivi Benedict Nos Sancte Basili †” (“Servants of the living God, bless us, Saint Basil”). The borders, upper sleeve, and hinged base are gilded copper, while other fittings are silver.

The hand features a gold plate with an engraved cross and upward-pointing hand, inscribed “† Dextera Di” (“the right hand of God”), similar to medallions on 10th-century bishops’ liturgical gloves, later mandated by Pope Innocent III. A comparable glove survives in the Werden Abbey treasury. A 1.2 cm × 0.6 cm hole, 6 cm deep, in the wooden core between the thumb and index finger, may have held a smaller reliquary, cross, or iconographic attribute of Saint Basil. The Essen Liber Ordinarius confirms the reliquary’s use in imparting blessings, making it one of the oldest surviving arm reliquaries.

=== Suanhild Gospel ===
A Gospel Book owned by Suanhild is now in the possession of the John Rylands Library. Suanhild donated the Gospel Book, its cover once adorned with gold plates, precious stones, and intricate metalwork, to the cathedral, following the example of her predecessor Theophanu, whose Gospel Book remains in the cathedral treasury. Long thought lost, the Suanhild Gospel, without its ornate cover, survives as manuscript Ms. Latin 110 in the John Rylands Library, Manchester. Records indicate it remained at Essen Abbey into the 18th century. In 1895, it appeared at a London art dealer and was purchased by Lord Lindsay for £300. In 1901, Mrs. Rylands acquired the Lindsay collection for the John Rylands Library, founded in memory of her husband. The manuscript likely entered the art trade after Essen Abbey’s dissolution in 1803, possibly taken by a canon.

A plenarius used on high holidays, the Gospel Book measures 22 × 15.5 cm, with a 15.5 × 8 cm text area and 15.5 × 10 cm illuminations, containing the four Gospels, four prefaces, and 176 parchment pages in 24 sheets. Written in Carolingian minuscule, it features 28 lines per page, six full-page illustrations, four decorative pages, five tendril-decorated initials, and 13 canon tables. A handwriting change after the Gospel of Mark suggests two scribes. The manuscript’s origin is unknown, with illuminations unattributed to any monastic school. A founders’ portrait depicting Suanhild and her deputy Brigida as co-founders, with the Virgin Mary as Maria Orans, is unusual for Western art, leading some scholars, such as Kahsnitz, to suggest it was created at Essen Abbey.

== Legacy ==
Using income from her donated estates, Suanhild established the Schwanhildis Office, held by a canon of Essen Abbey, to administer the properties and organize her memorial services. These included four annual masses, a vigil, and distributions of bread and monetary donations to the convent, held on her death anniversary. The office persisted for five years after the abbey’s dissolution in 1803, until the death of its last holder, former canon Nikolaus Poger, in 1808. The Prussian state then converted the foundation into a beneficium for the parish of Borbeck and the rural school in Frintrop, requiring the parish priest to hold an annual requiem mass for Suanhild. In 1913, the Archdiocese of Cologne lifted this obligation at the Borbeck priest’s request, as the foundation’s scholarship had dwindled to 8.05 marks.

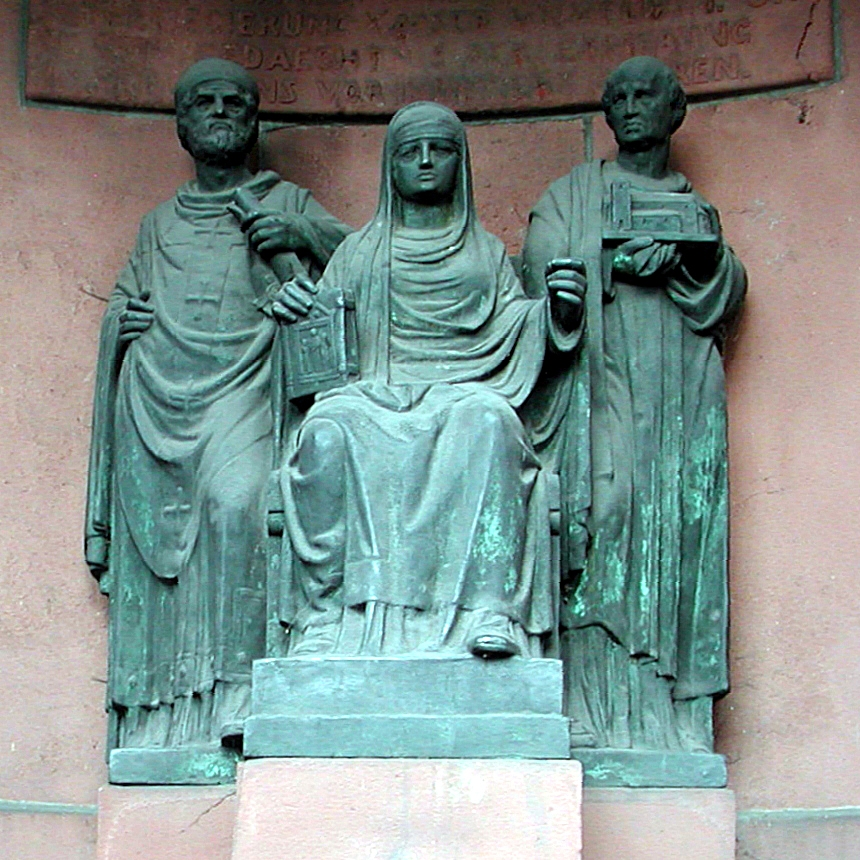
The figures of the Schwanhildbrunnen: Anno with the document, Suanhild and Heinrich von Essen with a model of the collegiate church

Suanhild is venerated in Stoppenberg, the district that grew around her collegiate church. The Schwanhildenbrunnen (Schwanhild Fountain), a 1915 stone-and-bronze monument designed by Cologne architect Carl Moritz, depicts Suanhild, Archbishop Anno II of Cologne, and Canon Henricus of Essen, who oversaw the church’s construction. The nearby Schwanhildenhöhe road leads to the hill where the church stands, and Schwanhildenstraße, also named for her, is in the same district.

== Assessment ==
Küppers and Mikat, in their book on the cathedral treasury, argue that the heyday of Essen Abbey ended with the death of Theophanu, the last abbess from an imperial family, a view some scholars debate. Suanhild continued the traditions of her predecessors, donating her inheritance to the abbey and funding the collegiate church of Essen-Stoppenberg. As Essen Cathedral was completed under Theophanu, Suanhild focused on other projects, including a valuable reliquary and a magnificent Gospel Book for the cathedral treasury. In contrast, her successor Lutgardis made no known contributions to the arts or church during her long reign. The scarcity of sources and Suanhild’s unknown ancestry may lead to her contributions being under-recognized.

== Bibliography ==
- Hermann, Sonja (2008). "Gold vor Schwarz – Der Essener Domschatz auf Zollverein: Katalog zur Ausstellung 2008". In Falk, Birgitta (ed.). Armreliquiar mit Reliquien des hl. Basilius [Arm reliquary with relics of St Basil] (in German). Essen: Klartext Verlag. ISBN 978-3-8375-0050-9.
- Humann, Georg (1904). Die Kunstwerke der Münsterkirche zu Essen [The works of art in the cathedral church in Essen] (in German). Düsseldorf: Schwann.
- Junghans, Martina (2002). Die Armreliquiare in Deutschland vom 11. bis zur Mitte des 13. Jahrhunderts [Arm reliquaries in Germany from the 11th to the middle of the 13th century] (Doctoral dissertation) (in German). University of Bonn. Kat.-Nr. 4.
- Küppers, Leonhard; Mikat, Paul (1966). Der Essener Münsterschatz [The Essen Minster Treasure] (in German). Essen: Fredebeul & Koenen.
- Horstkötter, Lutger (2003). "Äbtissin Schwanhild (ca. 1058 – ca. 1085), ihr Jahresgedächtnis und das Schwanhildisamt an der Essener Münsterkirche (bis 1808)" [Abbess Schwanhild (ca. 1058 - ca. 1085), her annual memorial and the Schwanhildisamt at Essen Minster (until 1808)]. Münster am Hellweg: Mitteilungsblatt des Vereins für die Erhaltung des Essener Münsters (in German). 56. Essen: 11 ff.
- Kahsnitz, Rainer (1970). "Die Essener Äbtissin Svanhild und ihr Evangeliar in Manchester" [The Essen abbess Svanhild and her gospels in Manchester]. Essener Beiträge: Beiträge zur Geschichte von Stadt und Stift Essen (in German). 85. Essen: 13–80.
