= Cross of Otto and Mathilde =

Tenth-century jewelled cross

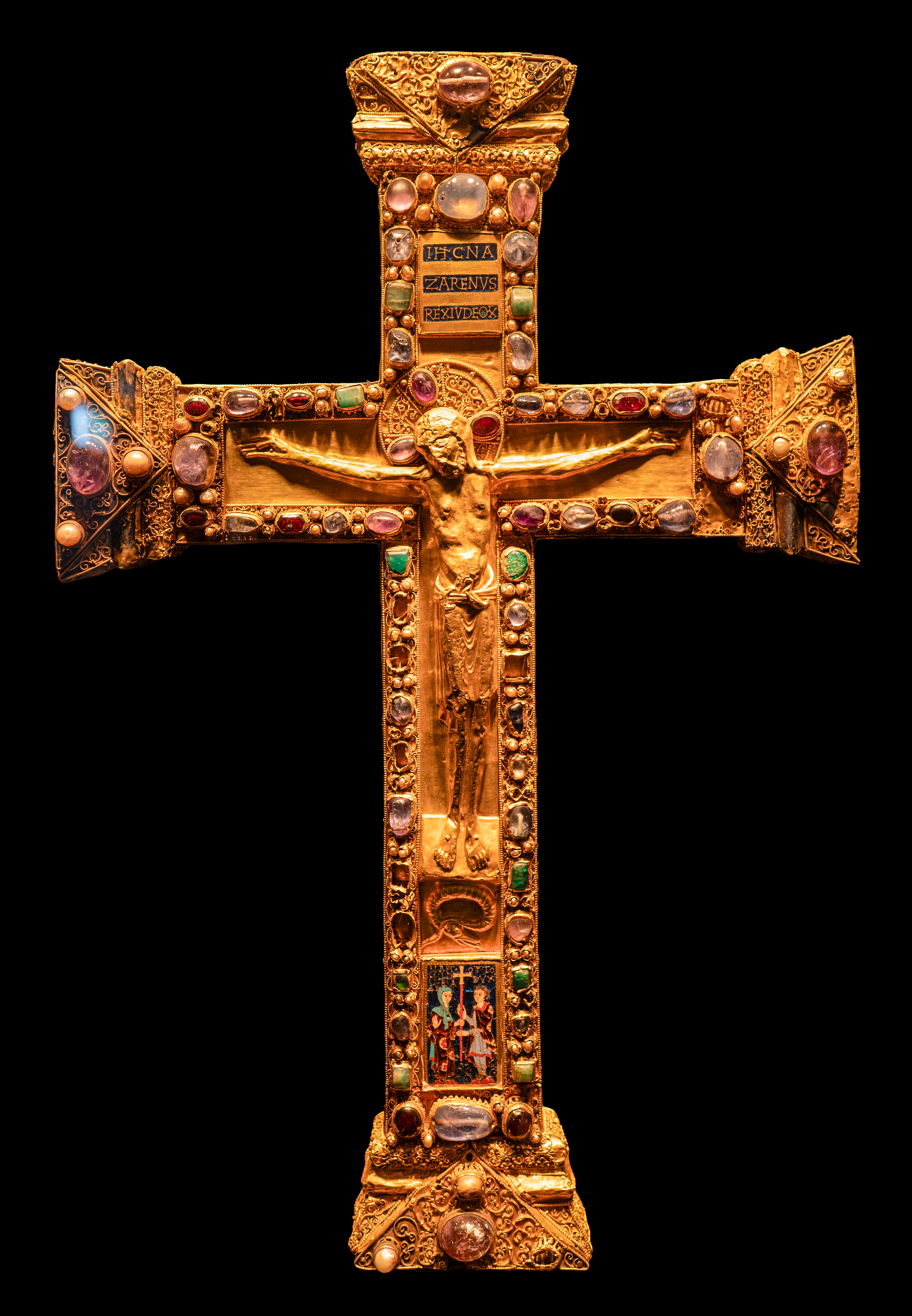
Cross of Otto and Mathilde, part of the Essen Cathedral Treasury

The Cross of Otto and Mathilde, Otto-Mathilda Cross, or First Cross of Mathilde (German: Otto-Mathilden-Kreuz) is a medieval crux gemmata (jewelled cross) processional cross in the Essen Cathedral Treasury. It was created in the late tenth century and was used on high holidays until recently. It is named after the two persons who appear on the enamel plaque below Christ: Otto I, Duke of Swabia and Bavaria and his sister, Mathilde, the abbess of the Essen Abbey. They were grandchildren of the emperor Otto I and favourites of their uncle, Otto II. The cross is one of the items which demonstrate the very close relationship between the Liudolfing royal house and Essen Abbey. Mathilde became Abbess of Essen in 973 and her brother died in 982, so the cross is assumed to have been made between those dates, or a year or two later if it had a memorial function for Otto. Like other objects in Essen made under the patronage of Mathilde, the location of the goldsmith's workshop is uncertain, but as well as Essen itself, Cologne has often been suggested, and the enamel plaque may have been made separately in Trier.

== Description ==
The cross is 44.5 centimetres (17.5 in) high and 29.5 centimetres (11.6 in) wide, with a core made of oak. It is a Latin cross, but the ends of the beams are flared, a feature found in many Ottonian jewelled crosses. Through their double ridges and triangles, the trapezoidal extensions are very close to those of Cross of Lothair in Aachen, which is usually dated to around 1000. The front side of the cross is decorated with a chased gold sheet. A raised border runs around this side of the cross, with gemstones set in gold filigree and separated by pearls. A fine string of pearls borders the space. The colour and size of the stones on opposite sides match, so that the jewels appear deliberately organised and clear. On the lower end of the vertical cross beam the donation plate in cloisonné enamel depicts "Mathild Abba" and "Otto Dux", both holding a standard-like cross.

The body of the suffering Christ is beaten from the gold sheet of the background plate. The bulging abdomen and the asymmetrical torso seem similar to the body of the Gero Cross in Cologne, as a result of which Cologne has been suggested as the cross's place of origin. Trier has also been considered in this regard, because the cloisonné plate on the cross might come from the workshop of Egbert, Archbishop of Trier. It is probable that only the enamel was made in Trier, and that the cross was assembled in another place. The halo on Christ's head reaches to the edge of the cross, while the three gemstones of the halo further emphasise the inclination of the head to the left. Between the feet, placed on the suppedaneum (footrest), and the donation plaque, there is the chased image of a snake, which is connected to the brazen snake of life in Numbers 21.4–9. According to another interpretation, however, it depicts a basilisk which refers to the Messiah as victor over evil in Psalm 91.13, "You will tread on the lion and the cobra; you will trample the great lion and the serpent." Above Christ's head there are two cloisonné plates with an inscription in three lines: IHC NA / ZARENVS / REX IVDEOR ("Jesus of Nazareth, King of the Jews"); the letters IHC stand for the first three letters of the name of Jesus in Greek.

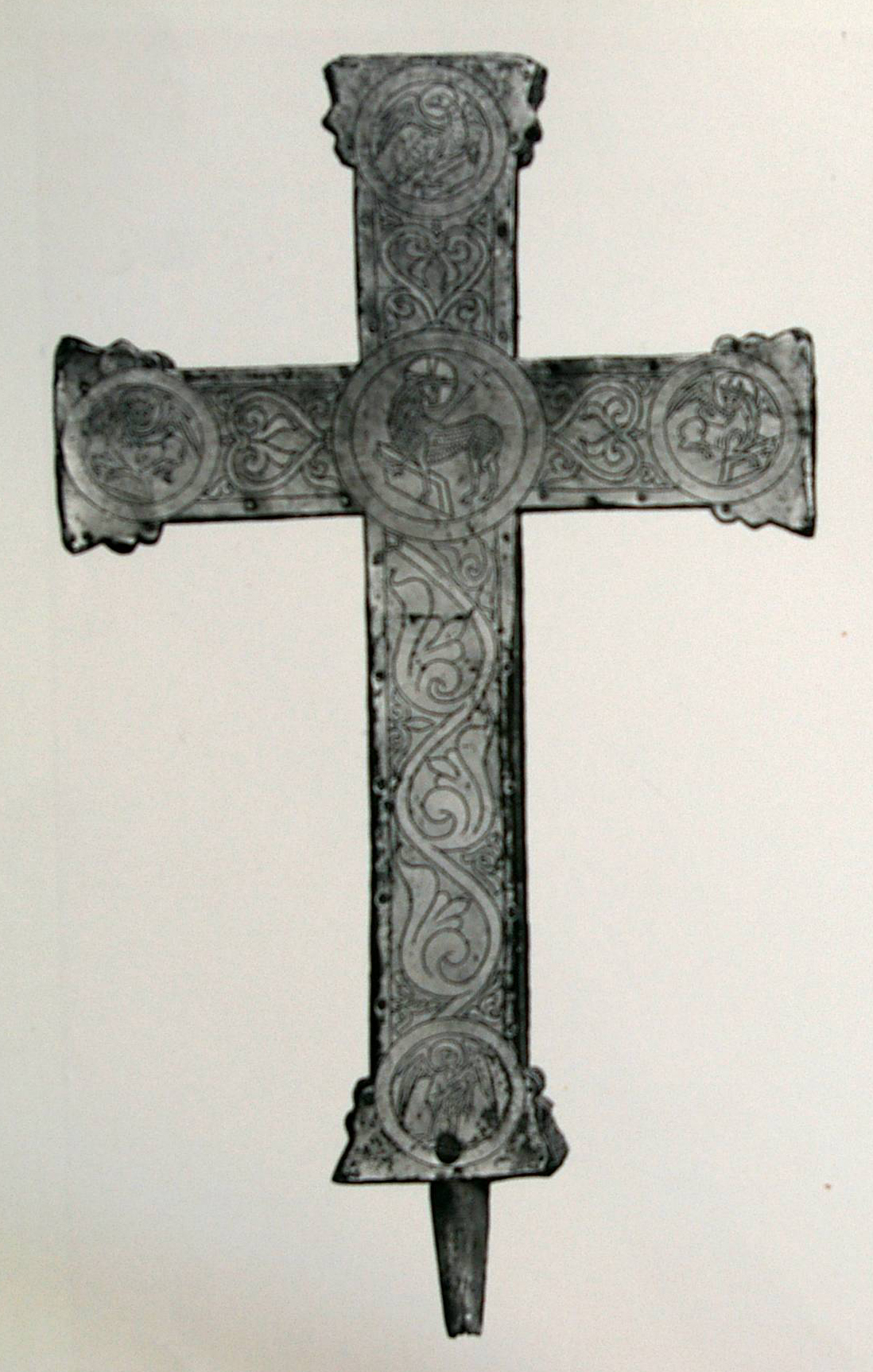
Backside of the Cross of Otto and Mathilde

The back side of the cross is decorated with gilt copper sheeting and has a simpler engraved design, which shows the four Evangelists on the ends of the cross beams and the lamb of God at the centre. These images are connected by a Tree of Life.

== Iconographic significance ==
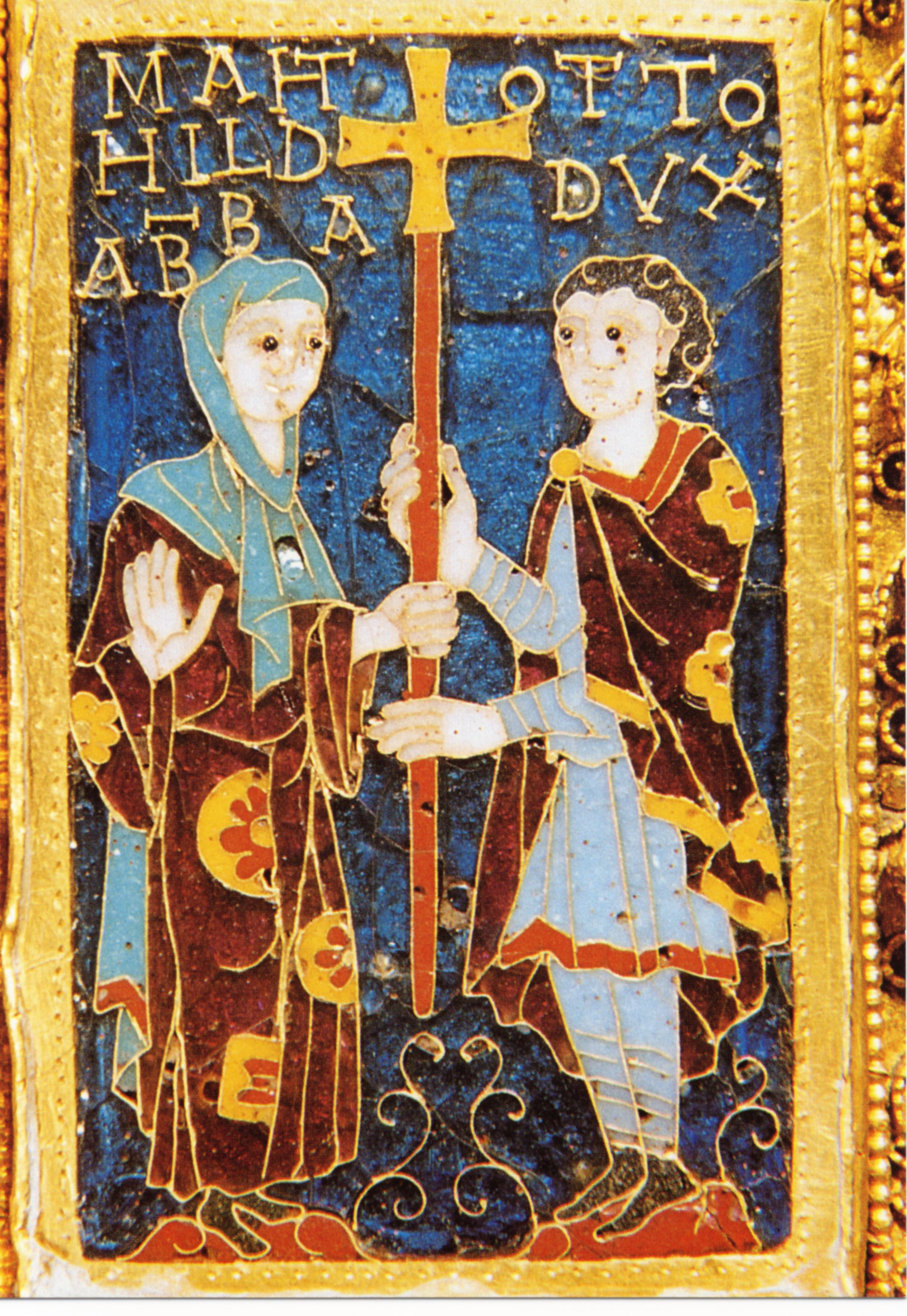
The donation plate in detail

The key to the interpretation and dating of the cross is the donation plate of the cross which has remained unchanged since its creation. On this plate, Otto, Duke of Swabia and Abbess Mathilde are depicted in court dress. The clothing depicted is probably Sogdian silk which came to the Frankish empire only in the form of gifts from the Byzantines. Similar fabric is held in the Essen cathedral treasury for wrapping up relics. Since Mathilde was abbess in Essen from 973 and she is not shown in the costume of an abbess, it is assumed in some newer scholarship that her depiction in the court dress of a high noble indicates that she appears here as the sister of Duke Otto and not in her role as abbess. Furthermore, the absence of symbols of a duke, such as a sword or a lance, for Otto suggest that the siblings are depicted as family members and not as dignitaries. Mathilde receives a cross from her brother. Otto holds the cross with two hands, but with outstretched fingers, while Mathilde grips it with a tightly closed fist. Her other hand is raised up, which is ambiguous. This could be taken as a greeting or acceptance gesture directed at Otto or as pointing up out of the image to the crucifixion, as a mediation gesture.

The donor portrait, especially the positioning of the siblings' hands, was earlier interpreted as indicating that Otto donated the cross to the abbey which his sister oversaw as abbess. But this makes it odd that Mathilde is not depicted as abbess and that Otto is depicted without ducal insignia. The common hypothesis, advocated by von Pothmann among others, that it was a combined donation of both siblings, may not fit with the fact that the cross depicted on the donor portrait does not match the appearance of the Cross of Otto and Mathilde. This was typically the case in medieval donation pictures.

According to newer literature the depiction of the cross being handed from Otto to Mathilde must therefore be seen symbolically with attention to the family history of the Liudolfing dynasty: with the death of Duke Otto on the 31 October 982, there were no further male descendants of Queen Eadgyth, the first wife of Emperor Otto I. Mathilde, who had a strong sense of family, became manager of the household with his death. As the last member of this branch of the family, she was especially committed to maintaining the memory of the family for her brother. The donor portrait can be seen in this context, symbolising Mathilde's wish to maintain a legacy for the childless Otto. On this basis it is believed that Mathilde donated the cross to the memory of her brother after his death in Otto II's Italian campaign of 982. The donation might have occurred shortly after his death, in 983 or 984, probably contemporaneously with the donation of the more than life size triumphal cross to the collegiate church of St. Peter und Alexander in Aschaffenburg, in which Otto was buried. The painted frame of this cross matches to the edging of the Cross of Otto and Mathilde.

== History ==
The cross has been located in Essen since its creation, excepting some evacuations during wars and other crises. The Inventarium reliquiarum Essendiensium of 12 July 1627, the earliest inventory of the Abbey's treasury, allows no certain identification, since it only recorded "two crucifixes decorated with lots of gems and gold, but gilt in copper on the back," a description which matches all four of the processional crosses in the Essen Cathedral Treasury. Likewise, the Liber ordinarius, which regulated the liturgical use of the Abbey treasures, only mentions processional crosses in general terms. Since donated sacral objects were not usually exchanged, it is believed that the cross belonged to the Abbey continuously until the secularisation of the Abbey in 1802. During the Thirty Years War, the Abbess fled with its treasure to Cologne. In 1794, as the French advanced on Essen, the cathedral treasury was brought to Steele (modern Essen-Steele) and hidden in the orphanage donated by Abbess Francisca Christina of Sulzbach.

At secularisation, the Catholic church of St Johann Baptist took over Essen Abbey and its property, including the cross. During the Ruhr Uprising of 1920 the whole treasury was taken to Hildesheim in absolute secrecy, whence it returned in equally secretive circumstances in 1925.

In the Second World War the cathedral treasury was taken first to Warstein, then to Albrechtsburg in Meissen and finally to a bunker in Siegen. After the war it was found there by American troops and, along with the rest of the treasury, the cross went to the State museum in Marburg and later to a collection for displaced artworks in Schloss Dyck in Rheydt. From April to October 1949, the Essen cathedral treasury was displayed in Brussels and Amsterdam and then returned to Essen.

With the establishment of the Diocese of Essen in 1958 and the promotion of Essen Minster to the status of cathedral, the cross became property of the diocese.

== Liturgical significance ==
=== Middle Ages ===
The liturgical use of the Cross of Otto and Mathilde in the Middle Ages is barely reconstructable. In principle, processional crosses were placed at or shortly after the altar and carried in processions. In this, the side with the crucifixion usually pointed forwards, with the members of the procession following Jesus in accordance with Matthew 10.38. The Essen Liber Ordinarius from the fourteenth century, which draws on earlier texts, records several processions. A processional cross was probably also a symbol of the Sovereign Abbey of Essen, comparable to the Imperial cross of the Imperial regalia.

A special role is specified in the Liber Ordinarius for the procession of the Easter vigil, which passed from Peter's Altar in the westwerk of the Minster, through the cloister, to the cemetery of the order where the graves were sprinkled with holy water, while the nuns made reference to salvation through the cross in an antiphon. This role has been attributed to the Cross of Otto and Mathilde by Beuckers on the grounds that it is the oldest and most elaborate of the four processional crosses at Essen. A similar procession, known from other convents, symbolised the resurrection of Christ from the dead and was included in the Easter liturgy. It had an intercessory character and was connected to memorial rituals. About the Essen procession, the Liber Ordinarius dictated that, unlike usual practice, the front side of the cross should look back at the procession. With the Cross of Otto and Mathilde this would have the effect that the siblings depicted on the donor portrait on the front side would be part of the procession, a fraternal prayer from beyond the grave which would be perfect for a donation made in memoriam.

=== Modern day ===
Despite its age and art historical significance, the Cross of Otto and Mathilde is no museum piece. Its religious use as a processional cross has never ceased. At the enthronement of the first Bishop of Essen on 1 January 1958, it was carried in front and it was used as a processional cross by him on high feasts and in processions. This practice was changed under his successors on conservation grounds, with a modern processional cross on the model of the Cross of Otto and Mathilde used on these occasions. At the mass held for the dedication of the Essen cathedral treasury chamber extension on 15 May 2009, the thousand-year-old cross served as an altar cross for the treasury.

== Bibliography ==
- Georg Humann. Die Kunstwerke der Münsterkirche zu Essen. Schwann, Düsseldorf 1904, pp. 115–160.
- Lasko, Peter, Ars Sacra, 800-1200, Yale University Press, 1995 (2nd edn.) ISBN 978-0300060485
- Alfred Pothmann. Der Essener Kirchenschatz aus der Frühzeit der Stiftsgeschichte. In: Günter Berghaus (ed.): Herrschaft, Bildung und Gebet. Gründung und Anfänge des Frauenstifts Essen. Klartext-Verlag, Essen 2000, ISBN 3-88474-907-2, pp. 135–153.
- Klaus Gereon Beuckers. "Das Otto-Mathilden-Kreuz im Essener Münsterschatz. Überlegungen zu Charakter und Funktion des Stifterbildes." in Katrinette Bodarwé, Thomas Schilp (edd.), Herrschaft, Liturgie und Raum. Studien zur mittelalterlichen Geschichte des Frauenstifts Essen (= Essener Forschungen zum Frauenstift. Vol. 1). Klartext-Verlag, Essen 2002, ISBN 3-89861-133-7, pp. 51–80.
- Lydia Konnegen. "Verborgene Schätze. Der Essener Münsterschatz in Zeiten des Ruhrkampfes." Das Münster am Hellweg. Vol. 58, 2005, pp. 67–81.
- Klaus Gereon Beuckers, Ulrich Knapp. Farbiges Gold. Die ottonischen Kreuze in der Domschatzkammer Essen und ihre Emails. Domschatzkammer Essen, Essen 2006, ISBN 3-00-020039-8.
- Sonja Hermann. Die Inschriften der Stadt Essen (= Die Deutschen Inschriften, vol. 81). Reichert, Wiesbaden 2011, ISBN 978-3-89500-823-8, pp. 13–14 no. 6 pl. II–III.
