= Gero Cross =

Large crucifix in Cologne, Germany

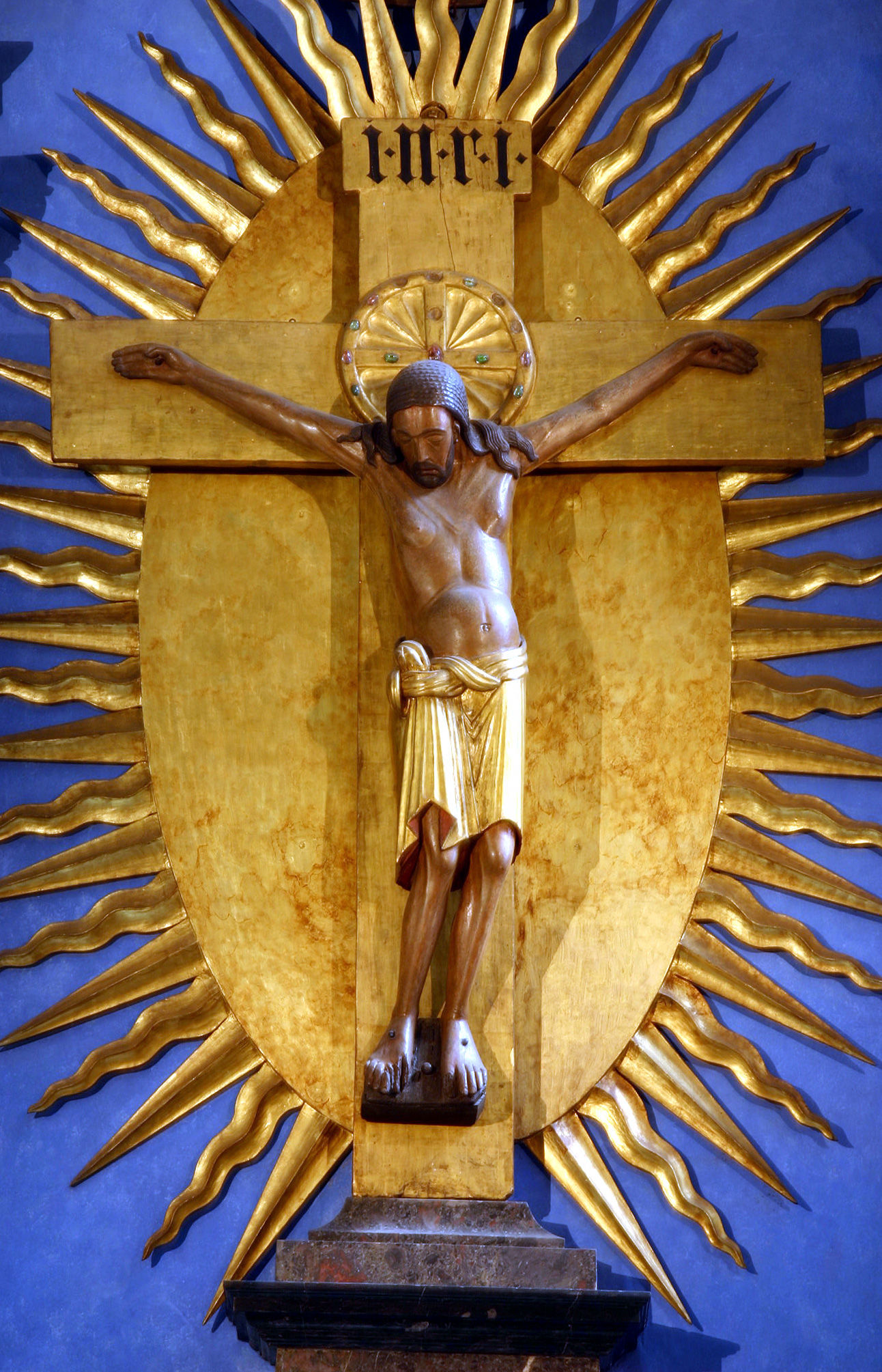
The Gero Cross.

The Gero Cross or Gero Crucifix (German: Gero-Kreuz), of around 965–970, is the oldest large sculpture of the crucified Christ north of the Alps, and has always been displayed in Cologne Cathedral in Germany. It was commissioned by Gero, Archbishop of Cologne, who died in 976, thus providing a terminus ante quem for the work. It is carved in oak, and painted and partially gilded – both have been renewed. The halo and cross-pieces are original, but the Baroque surround was added in 1683. The figure is 187 cm (6 ft 2 in) high, and the span of its arms is 165 cm (5 ft 5 in). It is the earliest known Western depiction of Christ on the cross while dead; earlier depictions had Christ appearing alive.

== Particular significance to medieval art ==
The Gero Cross is important to medieval art for the unique way it depicts Christ. The figure appears to be the earliest, and finest, of several life-size German wood sculpted crucifixions that appeared in the late Ottonian or early Romanesque period, later spreading to much of Europe. It is the first monumental depiction of the crucified Christ on the Cross and the first monumental sculpture dating from this period. Standing over six feet tall, it was one of the largest crosses of its time. Additionally, it appears to be the oldest Western depiction of a dead Christ on the cross; in most earlier depictions, Christ holds his head erect and looks straight ahead, or in some Carolingian examples looks down at the Virgin at the foot of the cross.

The shape of the Gero Cross is traditional to Carolingian religious art. However, this piece puts extra emphasis on the suffering of Jesus Christ's crucifixion, with the slumped head, lifeless body, and closed eyes. Other depictions are idealized and do not show Christ as vulnerable and disfigured. This was a major influence on later crosses, especially in 11th-century Germany, where you see more crosses that follow this rounded, natural style. The slumped head and twisted body, which arises as the hands are nailed to the cross at different heights, are found neither in Carolingian nor Byzantine art, and were to be slow to influence Western depictions, although the long hair spread over the shoulders is found in some Carolingian works. The style of the Gero Cross shows a great deal of Byzantine influence, most likely stemming from Otto II's marriage to a Byzantine princess, creating a cultural link between the Catholic Church and the Byzantine Empire. In crucifixions of the Gothic period, a still more slumped and curved figure of Christ, with knees bent sideways, was to become the standard depiction.

Earlier large figures of Christ on the Cross appear to have been in metal, or metal on a wooden core; there was said to be one in Charlemagne's Palatine Chapel in Aachen, and the Golden Madonna of Essen is an example of this type. The development of a tradition of free-standing monumental sculpture was crucial in Western art; in Byzantine art such images were and are avoided.

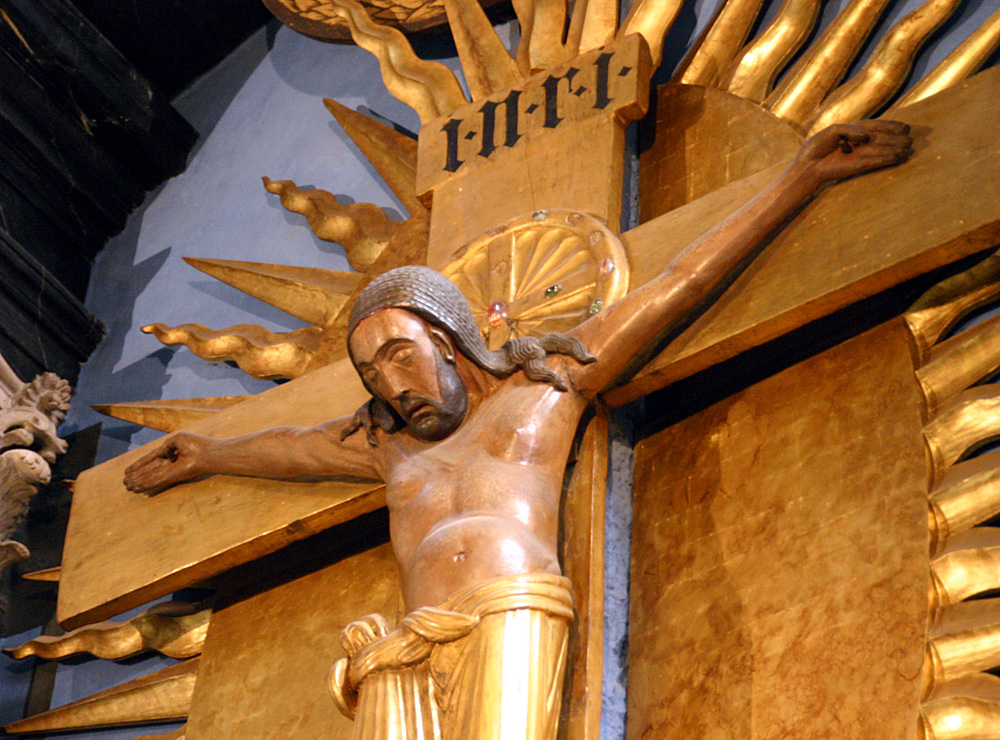
Detail of Christ

== History ==
The cross has always been in Cologne Cathedral; it now hangs in its own chapel near the sacristy – now a different, Gothic, building from the one it was made for. The Chronicon of Thietmar of Merseburg, written 1012–1018, said that it was originally displayed above Gero's grave; though no one is now sure where that was located in the old church, most scholars place it somewhere on the central axis of the nave, in which case it may have been at the chancel arch, the usual location of later roods or large crucifixes. It has long been celebrated and visited by pilgrims.

The old cathedral only underwent minor changes until the 13th century. Cologne became one of the most important churches in Europe for religious pilgrimages, containing not only the Gero Cross, but also the Magi reliquary and the Madonna of Milan. When it was decided to rebuild it, the old building was taken down piece by piece before the new building could be put up in 1248. In 1322, the Gero cross was placed in the new building where it remains today.

In 1904, a new layer of paint was added to the cross by W. Batzem. This, along with several other layers of paint below it, concealed many of the original details from the piece. However, modern day x-ray technology has determined that the eyes on the original layer of paint were indeed closed. This is unique because the artist did not depict Christ as idealized and overcoming death, but vulnerable and humanized. This is most likely because of a change in Christian teaching in the late tenth century that put salvation through Christ's death at the heart of Christian doctrine. The beam and the corpus are original; however, the gold sun and the marble altar it stands in were donated in 1683 by Canon Heinrich Mering.

Until the 1920s, despite local tradition, and the reference in Thietmar's chronicle associating it with Gero, it was thought to be at least a century later in date, and it is indeed innovative for its date. The dating was confirmed by dendrochronology in 1976, ending the controversy. Contrary to long-held tradition, the studies in 1976 revealed that there is no space in the back of the head to place relics.

According to the Luccan local histories, the Holy Face of Lucca in Italy is considerably older, though that sculpture had to be recreated in the Gothic period after being nibbled away by pilgrims, which makes this claim difficult to verify by art historians.

A replica of the crucifix hangs in the St. Alphonsus Chapel located in the Alphonse J. Schwartze Memorial Catholic Center in Jefferson City, Missouri. A smaller replica adorns the High Altar of St. Benedict’s Parish in Fort Worth, Texas.

== See also ==
- List of statues of Jesus
