= Cloisonné =

Enamelling technique used on metal

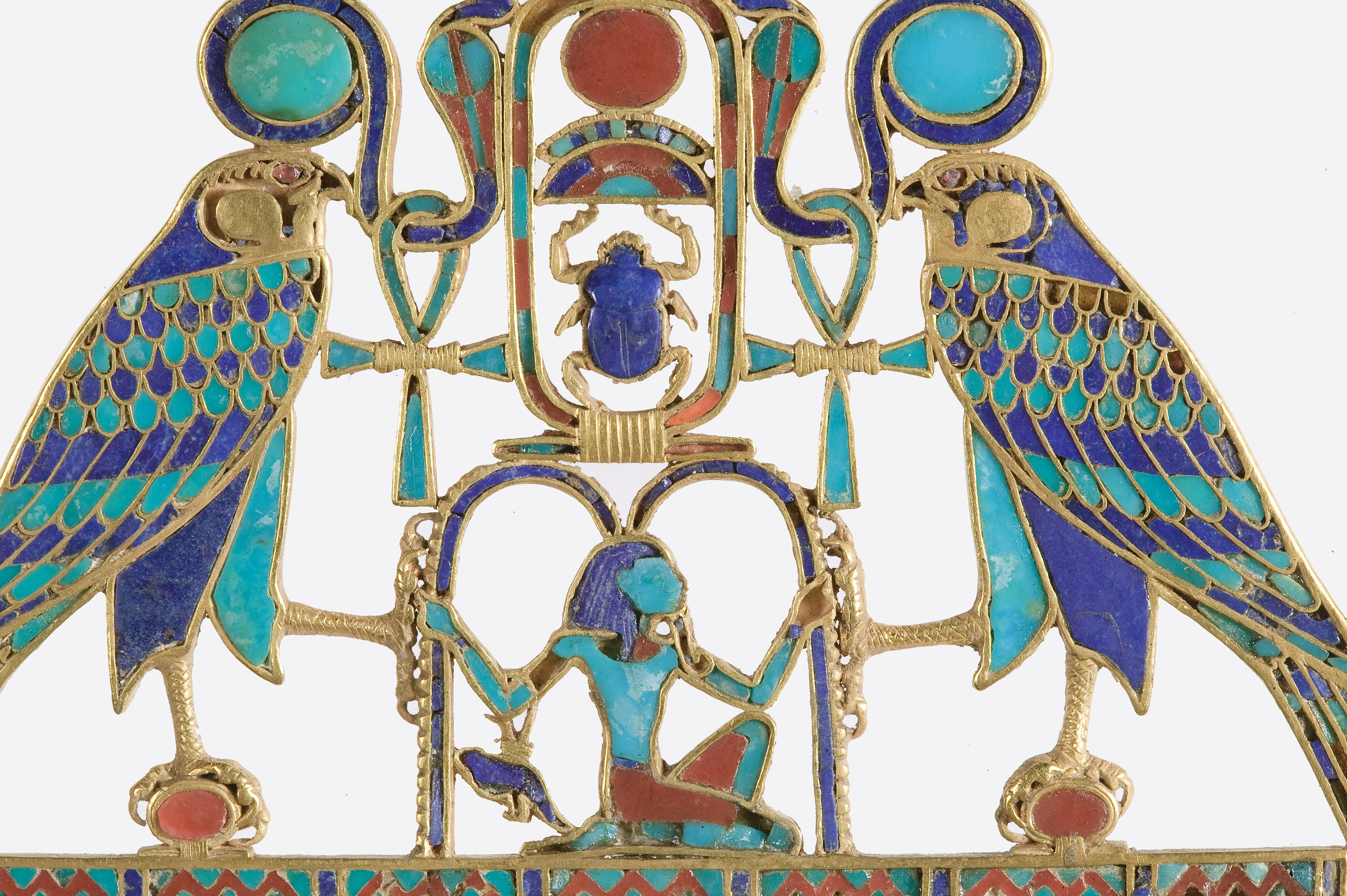
Pectoral of Senusret II, from his daughter's grave, using shaped stones rather than enamel. Cloisonné inlays on gold of carnelian, feldspar, garnet, turquoise, lapis lazuli, 1880s BC

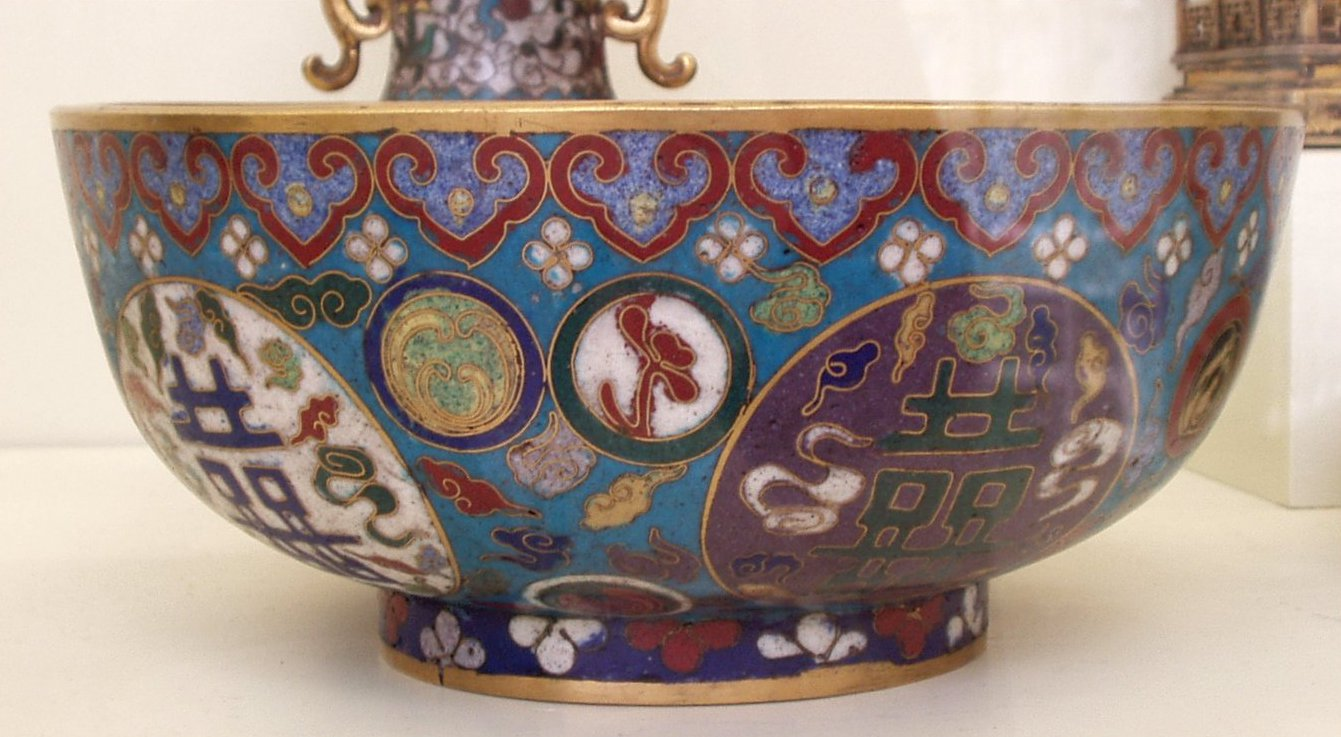
Chinese Ming Dynasty cloisonné enamel bowl, using nine colours of enamel

Cloisonné (French: [klwazɔne]) is an ancient technique for decorating metalwork objects with colored material held in place or separated by metal strips or wire, normally of gold. In recent centuries, vitreous enamel has been used, but inlays of cut gemstones, glass and other materials were also used during older periods. Cloisonné enamel was probably developed as an easier imitation of cloisonné work using gems. The resulting objects can also be called cloisonné.

The decoration is formed by first adding compartments (cloisons in French) to the metal object by soldering or affixing silver or gold as wires or thin strips placed on their edges. These remain visible in the finished piece, separating the different compartments of the enamel or inlays, which are often of several colors. Cloisonné enamel objects are worked on with enamel powder made into a paste. The objects are fired in a kiln for finishing. If gemstones or colored glass are used, the pieces need to be cut or ground into the shape of each cloison.

In antiquity, the cloisonné technique was mostly used for jewellery and small fittings for clothes, weapons, or similar small objects decorated with geometric or schematic designs, with thick cloison walls. In the Byzantine Empire, techniques using thinner wires were developed to allow more pictorial images to be produced. These were mostly used for religious images and jewellery, and by then always using enamel. This was used in Europe, especially in Carolingian and Ottonian art. By the 14th century this enamel technique had been replaced in Europe by champlevé. By then, cloisonné technique had spread to China, where it was soon used for much larger vessels such as bowls and vases. The technique remains common in China to the present day. From the 18th century, artisans in the West produced cloisonné enamel objects using Chinese-derived styles.

In Middle Byzantine architecture cloisonné masonry refers to walls built with a regular mix of stone and brick, often with more of the latter. The 11th or 12th-century Pammakaristos Church in Istanbul is an example.

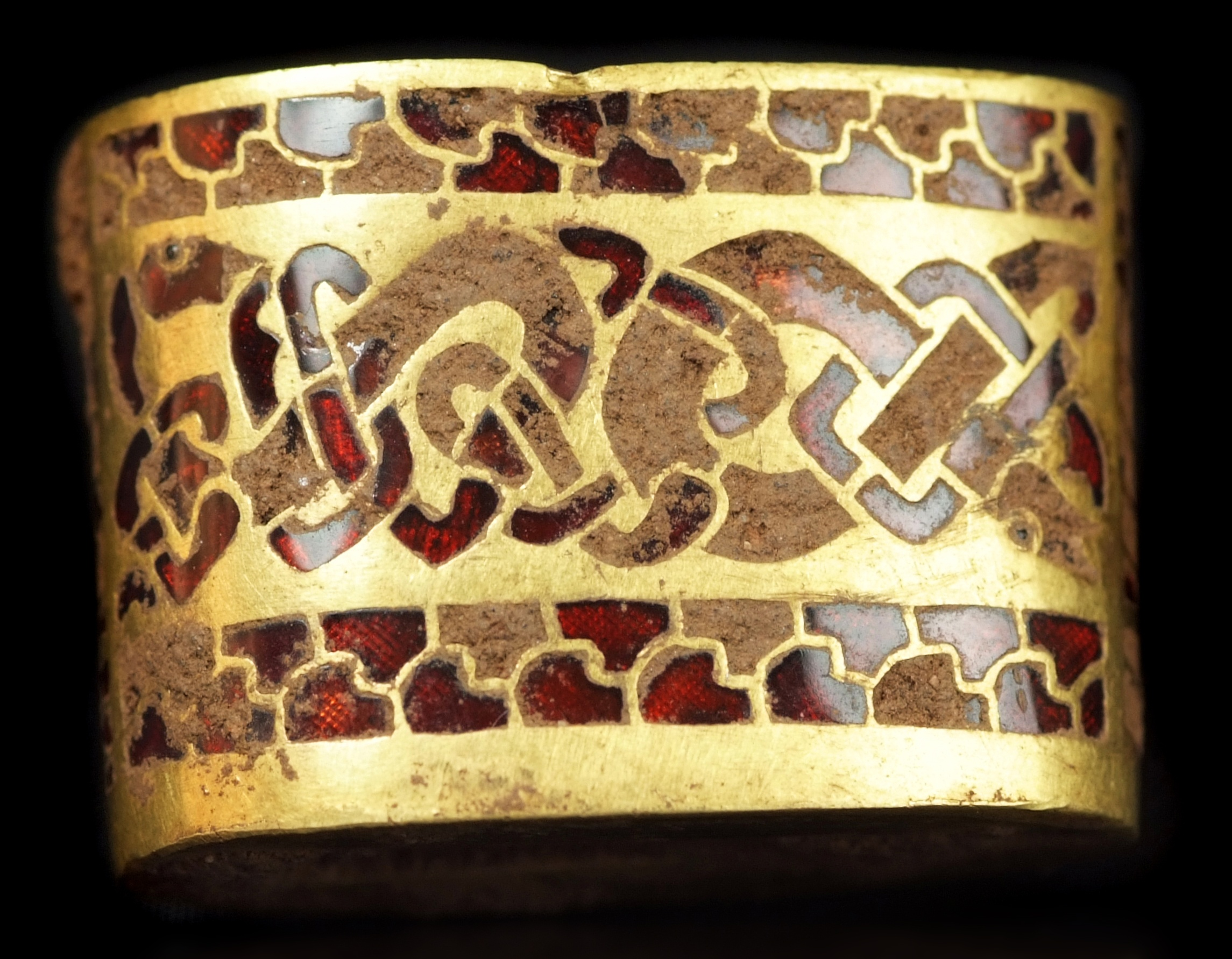
Early 7th century Anglo-Saxon seax (knife) hilt fitting, gold with garnet cloisonné inlay. Staffordshire Hoard, partially cleaned.

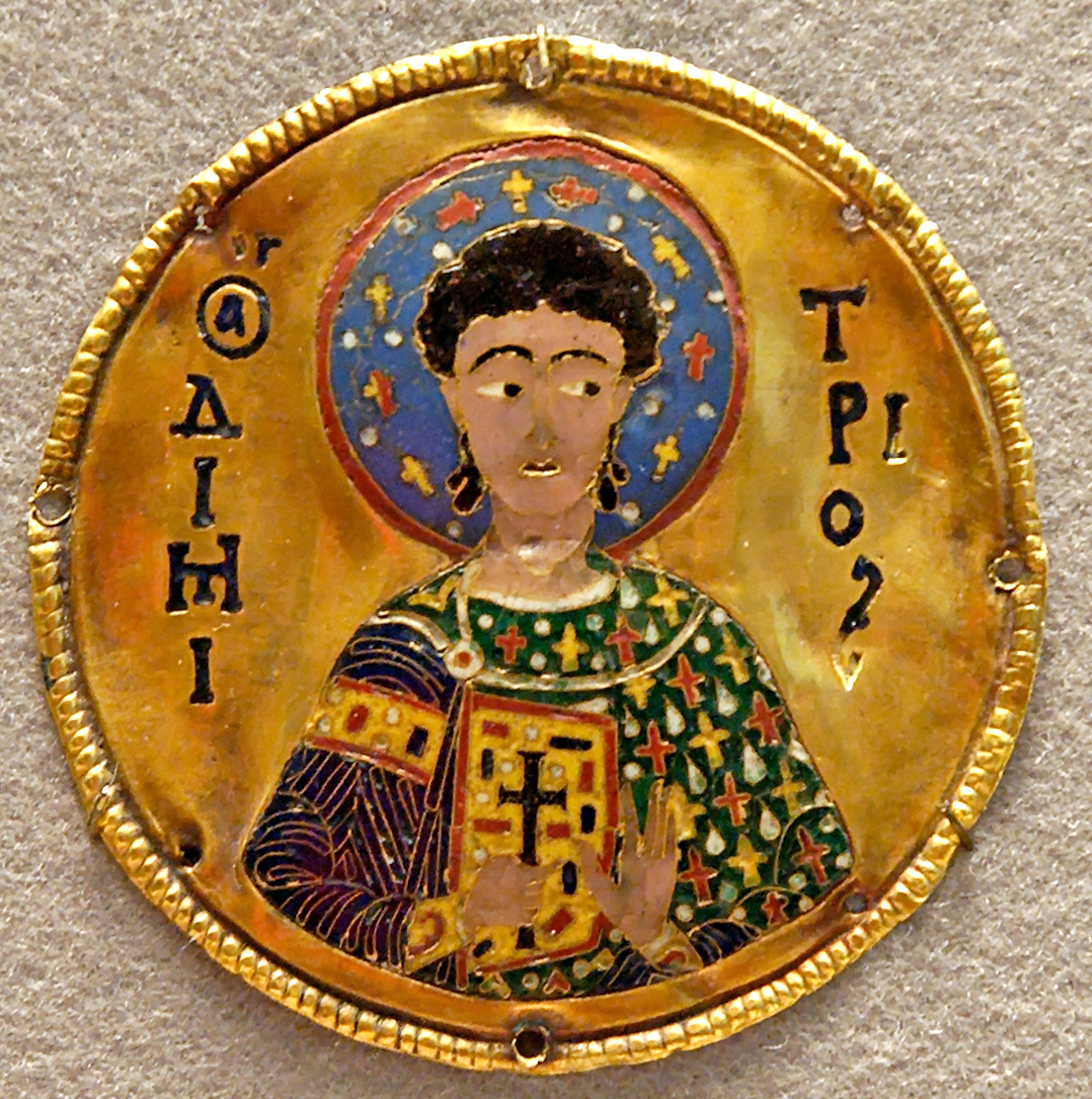
Byzantine cloisonné enamel plaque of St Demetrios, c. 1100, using the senkschmelz or "sunk" technique and the new thin-wire technique

== History ==
=== Ancient world ===
Cloisonné first developed in the jewellery of the ancient Near East, and the earliest works with enamel all used the cloisonné technique, placing the enamel within small cells with gold walls. This had been used as a technique to hold pieces of stone and gems tightly in place since the 3rd millennium BC, for example in Mesopotamia, and later in Egypt. Enamel seems likely to have developed as a cheaper method of achieving similar results.

The earliest surviving undisputed objects known to use enamel are a group of Mycenaean rings from a tomb in Cyprus, dated to the 12th century BC, which used very thin wire.

In the jewellery of ancient Egypt, including the pectoral jewels of the pharaohs, thicker strips form the cloisons, which remain small. In Egypt gemstones and enamel-like materials (sometimes called "glass-paste") were both used. Although Egyptian pieces, including jewellery from the Tomb of Tutankhamun of c. 1325 BC, are frequently described as using "enamel", many scholars doubt that the glass paste was sufficiently melted to be properly so described, and use terms such as "glass-paste". It seems possible that in Egyptian conditions the melting point of the glass and gold were too close to make enamel a viable technique. Nonetheless, there appear to be a few actual examples of enamel, perhaps from the Third Intermediate Period of Egypt (beginning 1070 BC) on. But it remained rare in both Egypt and Greece.

The technique appears in the Koban culture (c. 1200 to 350 BC) of the northern and central Caucasus, and was perhaps carried by the Sarmatians to the ancient Celts, but they essentially used the champlevé technique. Subsequently, enamel was just one of the fillings used for the small, thick-walled cloisons of the Late Antique and Migration Period styles. At Sutton Hoo, the Anglo-Saxon pieces (dated to the 6th or 7th centuries AD) mostly use garnet cloisonné, but this is sometimes combined with enamel in the same piece. A problem that adds to the uncertainty over early enamel is artefacts (typically excavated) which appear to have been prepared for enamel, but which have now lost whatever filled the cloisons. This occurs in several different regions, from ancient Egypt to Anglo-Saxon England. Once enamel becomes more common, as in medieval Europe after about 1000, the assumption that enamel was originally used becomes safer.

=== Byzantium and Europe ===
The Byzantines perfected a unique form of cloisonné icons. Byzantine enamel spread to surrounding cultures and a particular type, often known as "garnet cloisonné" is widely found in the Migration Period art of the "barbarian" peoples of Europe, who used gemstones, especially red garnets, as well as glass and enamel, with small thick-walled cloisons. Red garnets and gold made an attractive contrast of colours, and for Christians the garnet was a symbol of Christ. This type is now thought to have originated in the Late Antique Eastern Roman Empire and to have initially reached the Migration peoples as diplomatic gifts of objects probably made in Constantinople, then copied by their own goldsmiths. Glass-paste cloisonné was made in the same periods with similar results – compare the gold Anglo-Saxon fitting with garnets (right) and the Visigothic brooch with glass-paste in the gallery. Thick ribbons of gold were soldered to the base of the sunken area to be decorated to make the compartments, before adding the stones or paste. In the Byzantine world the technique was developed into the thin-wire style suitable only for enamel described below, which was imitated in Europe from about the Carolingian period onwards.

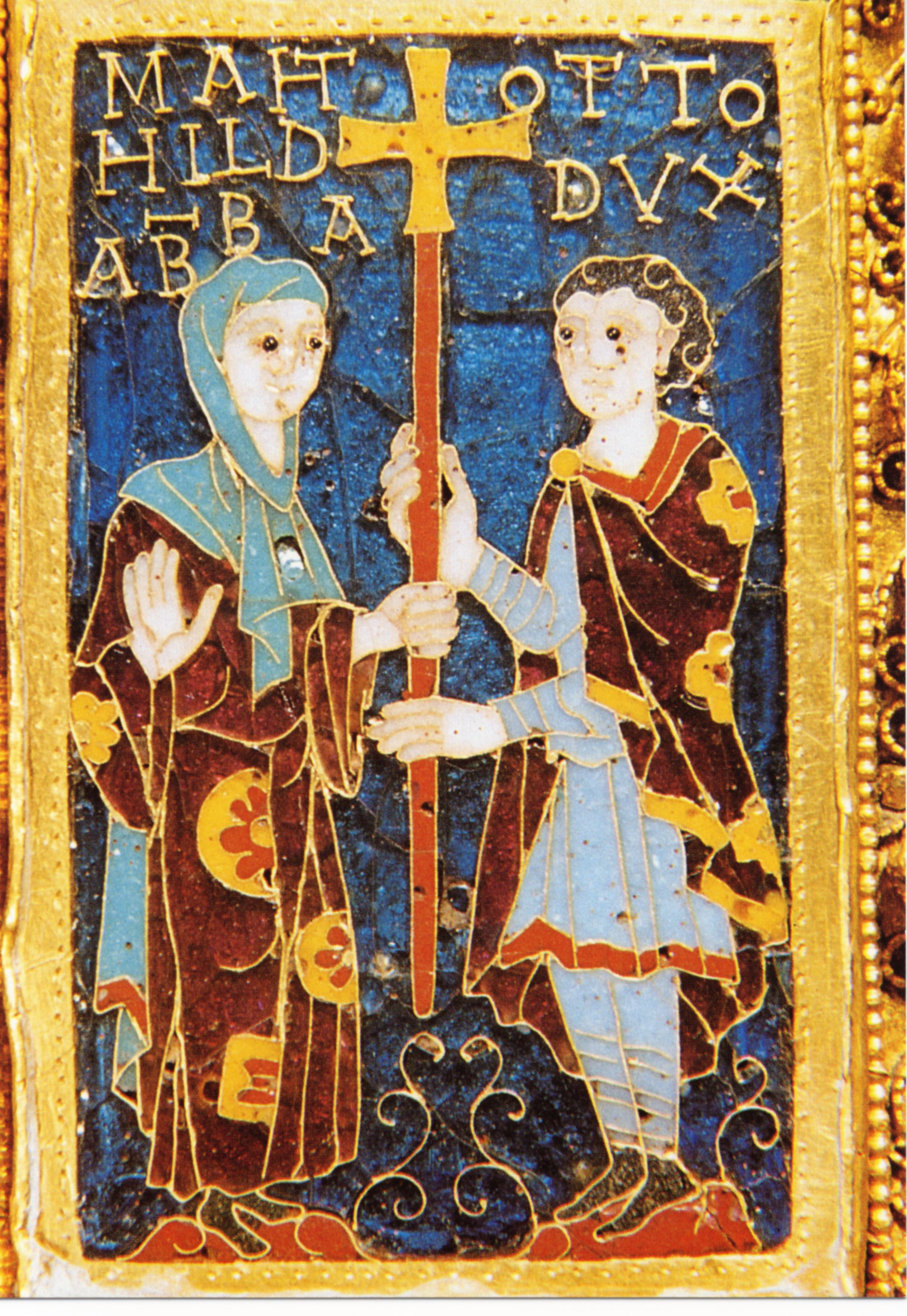
Plaque from the 10th-century Cross of Otto and Mathilde in Vollschmelz cloisonné enamel on gold

The dazzling technique of the Anglo-Saxon dress fittings from Sutton Hoo include much garnet cloisonné, some using remarkably thin slices, enabling the patterned gold beneath to be seen. There is also imported millefiori glass cut to fit like the gems. Sometimes compartments filled with the different materials of cut stones or glass and enamel are mixed to ornament the same object, as in the Sutton Hoo purse-lid.

From about the 8th century, Byzantine art began again to use much thinner wire more freely to allow much more complex designs to be used, with larger and less geometric compartments, which was only possible using enamel. These were still on relatively small objects, although numbers of plaques could be set into larger objects, such as the Pala d'Oro, the altarpiece in Saint Mark's Cathedral, Venice. Some objects combined thick and thin cloisons for varied effect. The designs often (as at right) contained a generous background of plain gold, as in contemporary Byzantine mosaics. The area to be enamelled was stamped to create the main depression, pricked to help the enamel adhere, and the cloisons added.

Two different techniques in Byzantine and European cloisonné enamel are distinguished, for which the German names are still typically used in English. The earliest is the Vollschmelz ("full" enamel, literally "full melt") technique where the whole of a gold base plate is to be covered in enamel. The edges of the plate are turned up to form a reservoir, and gold wires are soldered in place to form the cloisons. The enamel design therefore covers the whole plate. In the Senkschmelz ("sunk" enamel, literally "sunk melt") technique the parts of the base plate to hold the design are hammered down, leaving a surrounding gold background, as also seen in contemporary Byzantine icons and mosaics with gold glass backgrounds, and the saint illustrated here. The wires and enamels are then added as before. The outline of the design will be apparent on the reverse of the base plate. The transition between the two techniques occurs around 900 in Byzantine enamel, and 1000 in the West, though with important earlier examples.

The plaques with apostles of around the latter date on the Holy Crown of Hungary show a unique transitional phase, where the base plaque has hammered recesses for the design, as in senkschmelz work, but the enamel covers the whole plaque except for thick outlines around the figures and inscriptions, as in the vollschmelz technique (see the gallery below for examples of this technique and vollschmelz work). Some 10th-century pieces achieve a senkschmelz effect by using two plates superimposed on each other, the upper one with the design outline cut out and the lower one left plain.

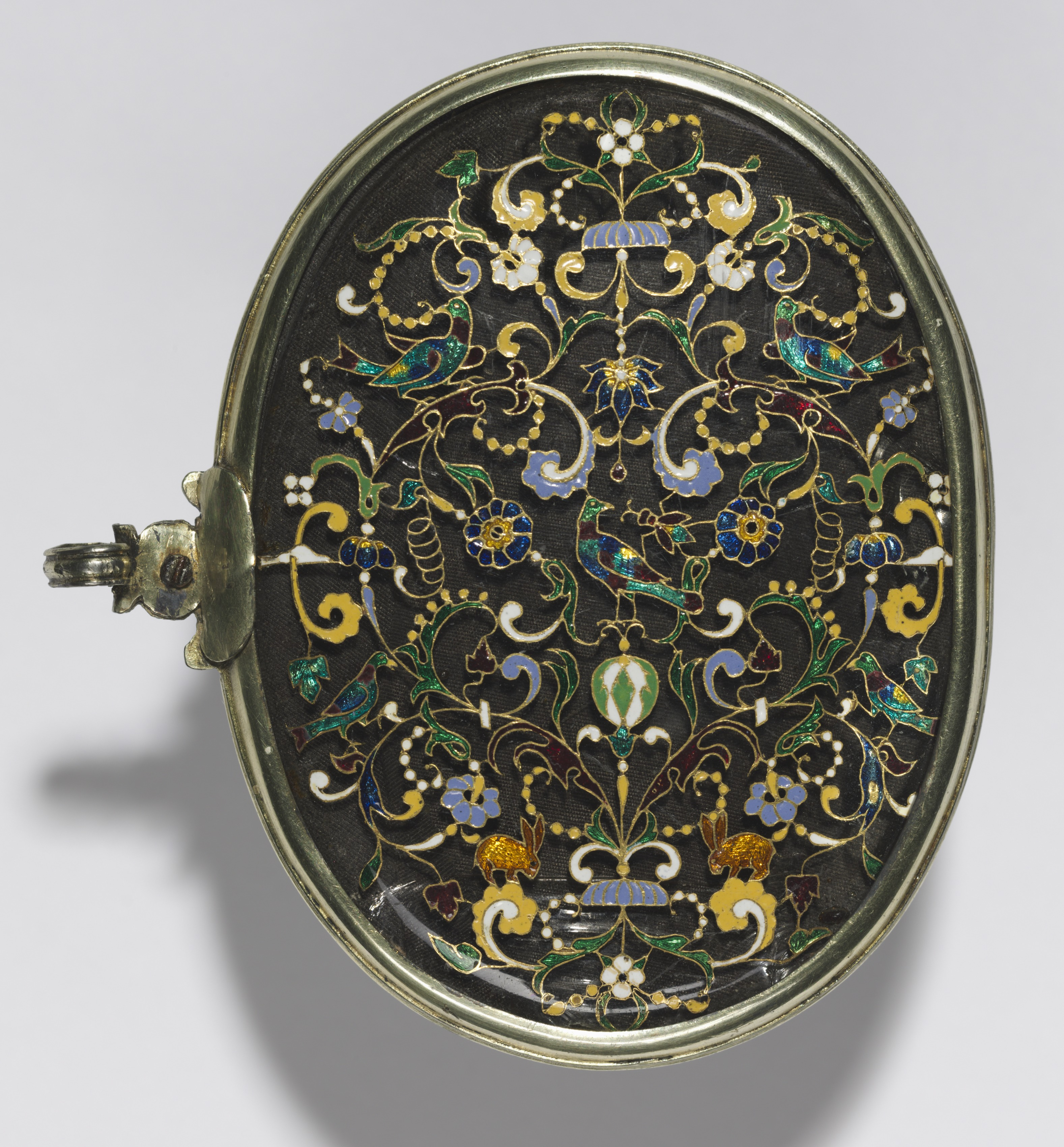
French 16th-century mirror-back, with cloisonné/plique-à-jour backed onto glass or rock crystal

In medieval Western Europe cloisonné enamel technique was gradually overtaken by the rise of champlevé enamel, where the spaces for the enamel to fill are created by making recesses (using various methods) into the base object, rather than building up compartments from it, as in cloisonné. This happened during the 11th century in most centres in Western Europe, though not in Byzantium; the Stavelot Triptych, Mosan art of around 1156, contains both types, but the inner cloisonné sections were probably gifts from Constantinople. Champlevé allowed increased expressiveness, especially in human figures, and was also cheaper, as the metal base was usually just copper and if gold was used, it was generally to gild surrounding bare metal. In turn champlevé was replaced by the 14th or 15th century by painted enamels, once techniques were evolved that allowed the enamel to be painted onto a flat background without running. Limoges enamel was a great centre for both types.

Plique-à-jour is a related enameling technique which uses clear enamels and no metal backplate, producing an object that has the appearance of a miniature stained glass object – in effect cloisonné with no backing. Plique-a'-jour is usually created on a base of mica or thin copper which is subsequently peeled off (mica) or etched away with acid (copper). In the Renaissance the extravagant style of pieces effectively of plique-à-jour backed onto glass or rock crystal was developed, but was never very common.

Other ways of using the technique have been developed, but are of minor importance. In 19th century Japan it was used on pottery vessels with ceramic glazes, and it has been used with lacquer and modern acrylic fillings for the cloisons. A version of cloisonné technique is often used for lapel badges, logo badges for many objects such as cars, including BMW models, and other applications, though in these the metal base is normally cast with the compartments in place, so the use of the term cloisonné, though common, is questionable. That technique is correctly referred to by goldsmiths, metalsmiths and enamellists as champlevé.

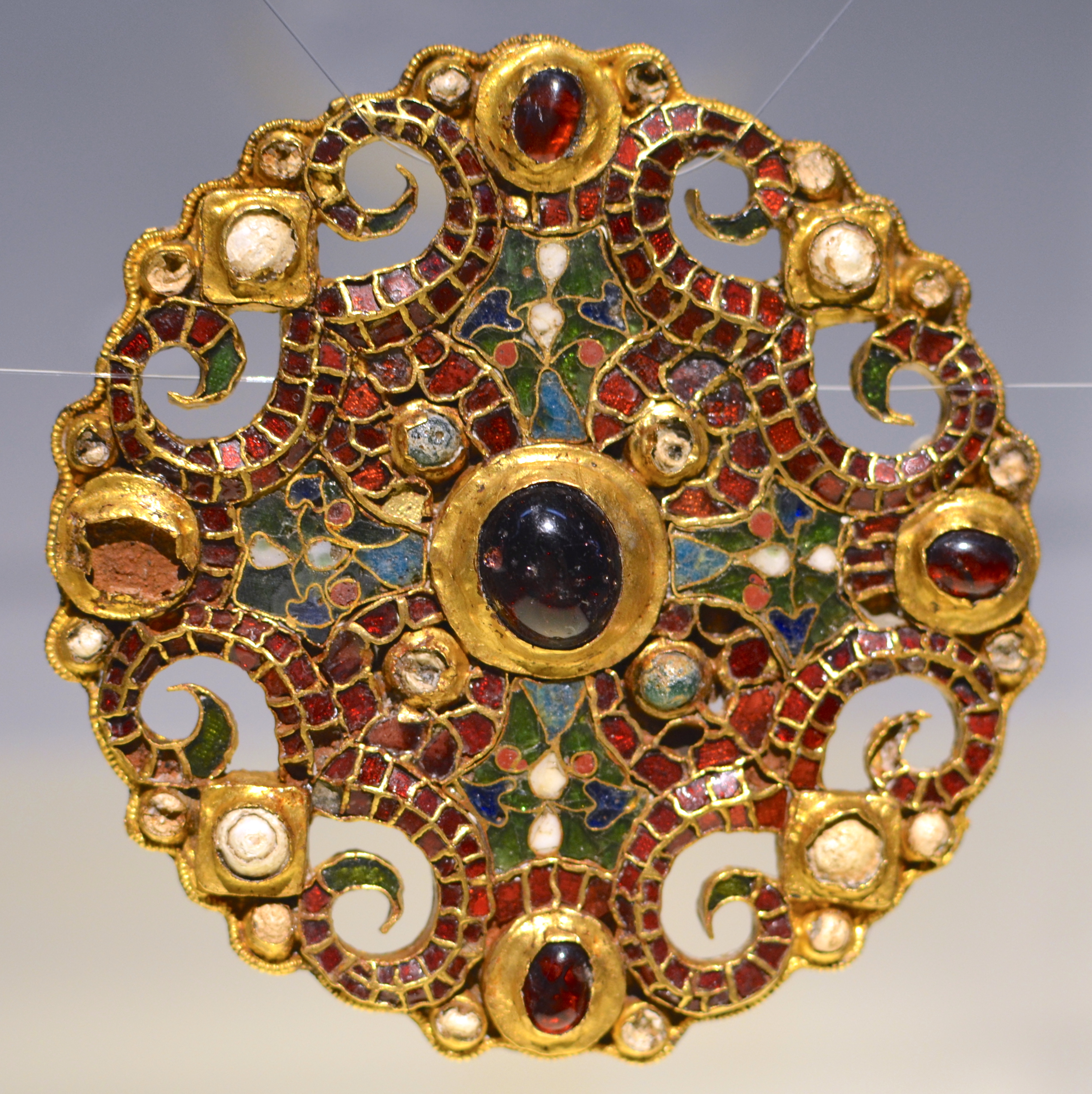
The Dorestad Brooch, c. 800, found in the Netherlands. Gold, pearls, with cloisonné almandine, enamel, and glass.

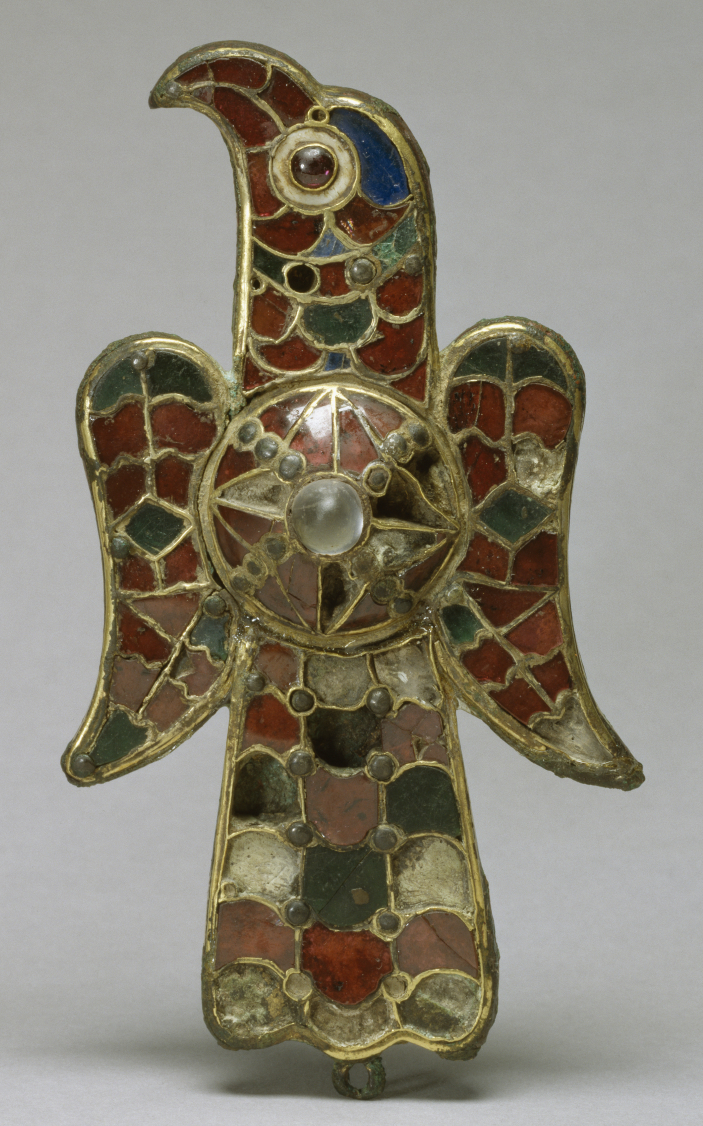
Visigothic 6th-century eagle-fibula, from Spain with garnets, amethysts, and colored glass, and some cloisons now empty.

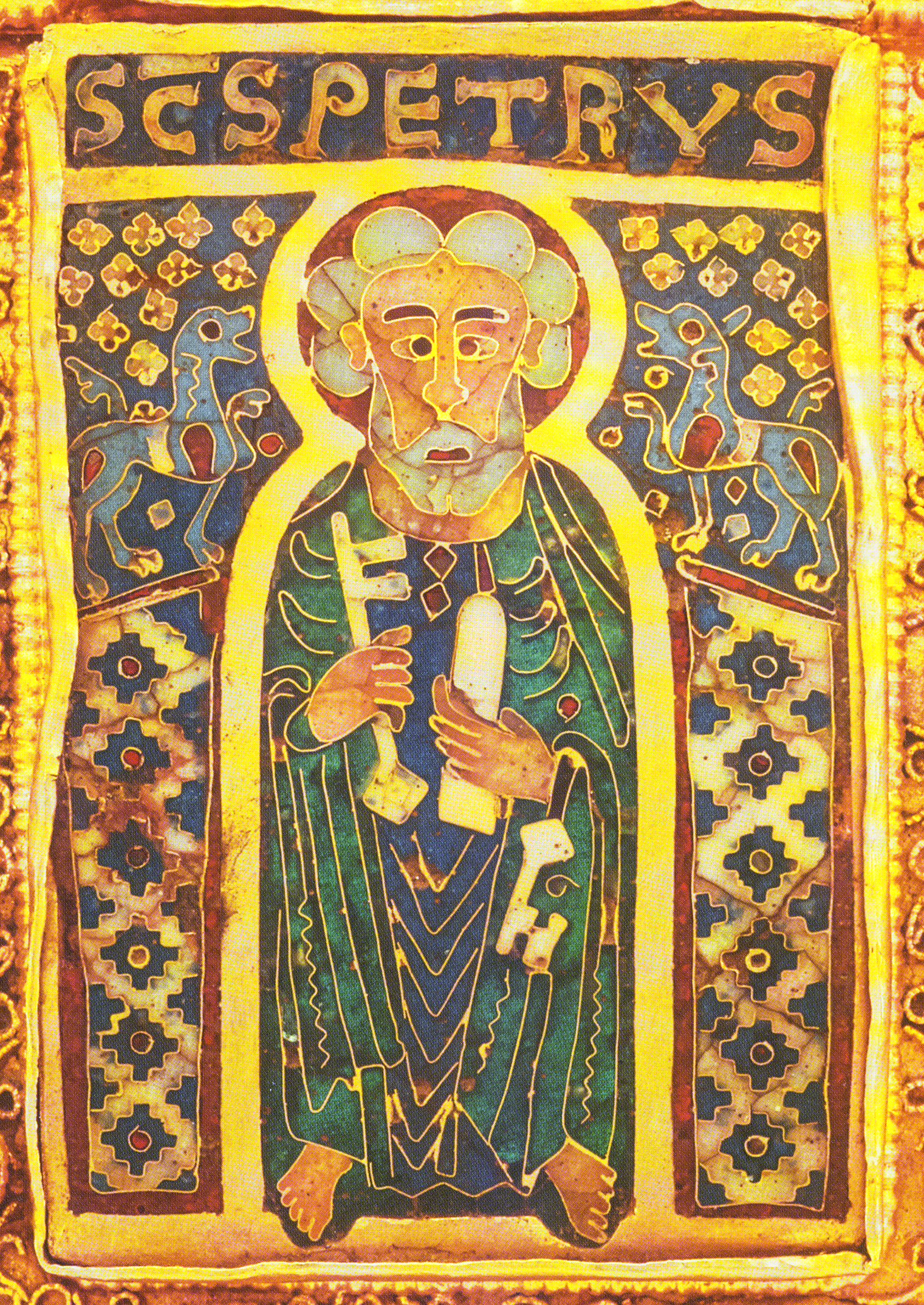
Plaque with Saint Peter showing the unique transitional technique of the Holy Crown of Hungary (see text)

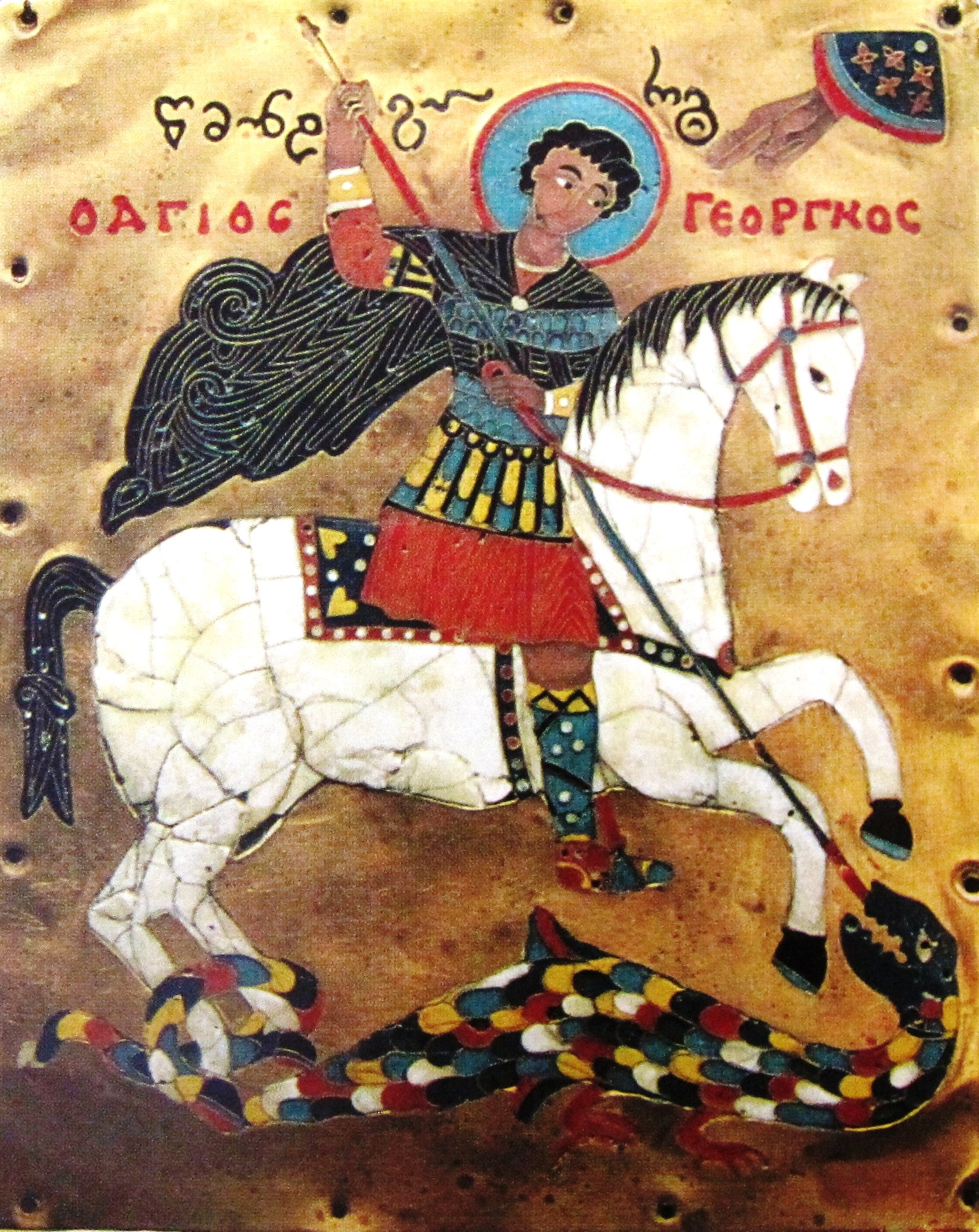
St George slaying the dragon, 12th century cloisonné enamel on gold, Georgia

=== China ===
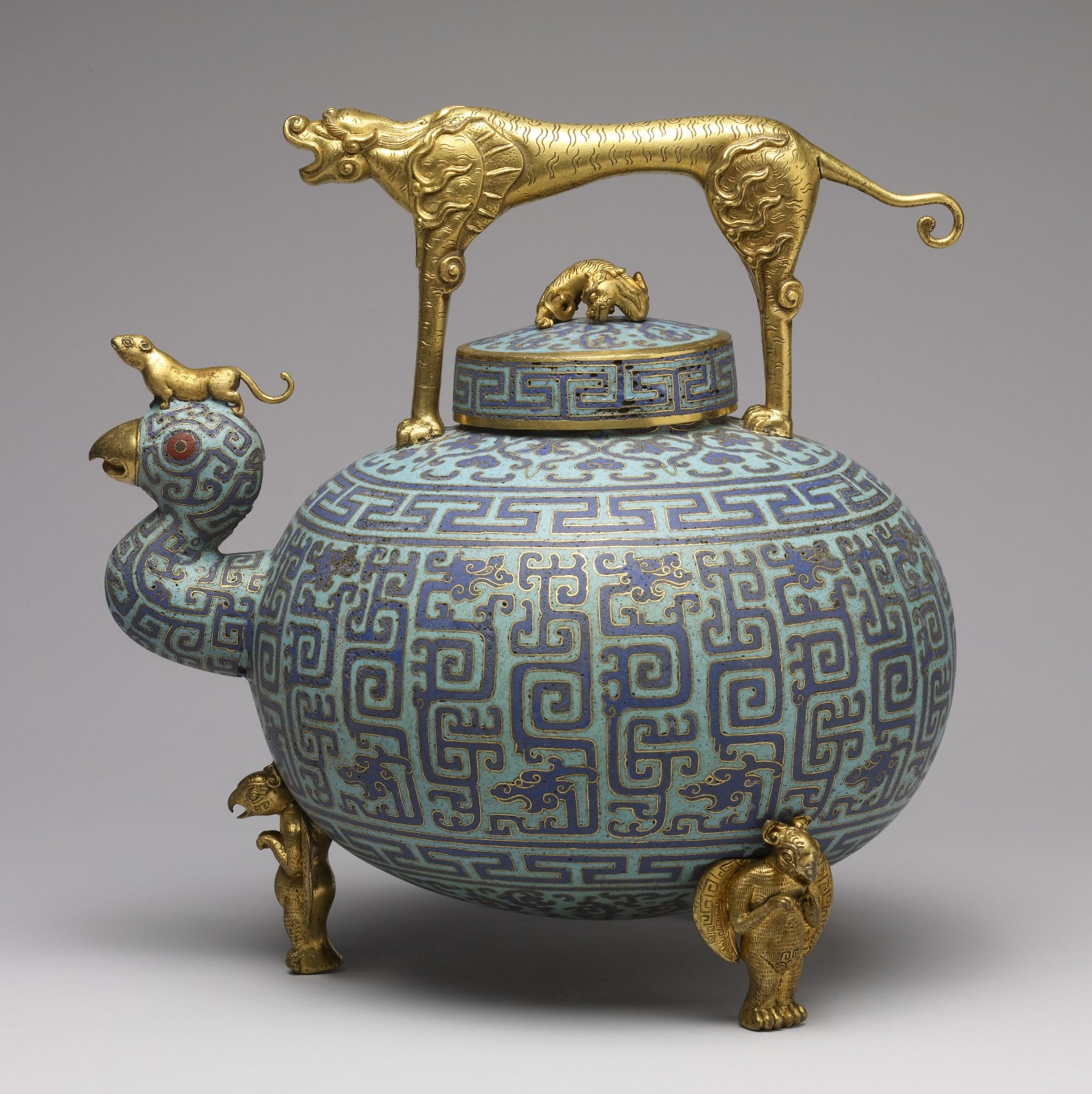
An 18th-century Chinese wine pot with cloisonné enamel and gilt bronze; the design was loosely based on Zhou Dynasty inlaid bronzes of the 5th–4th centuries BC

From Byzantium or the Islamic world the technique reached China in the 13–14th centuries; the first written reference is in a book of 1388, where it is called "Dashi ware". No Chinese pieces clearly from the 14th century are known, the earliest datable pieces being from the reign of the Xuande Emperor (1425–35), which however show a full use of Chinese styles suggesting considerable experience in the technique. It was initially regarded with suspicion by Chinese connoisseurs, firstly as being foreign, and secondly as appealing to feminine taste. However, by the beginning of the 18th century the Kangxi Emperor had a cloisonné workshop among the many Imperial factories. The most elaborate and highly valued Chinese pieces are from the early Ming Dynasty, especially the reigns of the Xuande Emperor and Jingtai Emperor (1450–57), although 19th century or modern pieces are far more common. The Chinese industry seems to have benefited from a number of skilled Byzantine refugees fleeing the Fall of Constantinople in 1453, although based on the name alone, it is far more likely China obtained knowledge of the technique from the middle east. In much Chinese cloisonné blue is usually the predominant colour, and the Chinese name for the technique, jingtailan ("Jingtai blue ware"), refers to this, and the Jingtai Emperor. Quality began to decline in the 19th century. Initially heavy bronze or brass bodies were used, and the wires soldered, but later much lighter copper vessels were used, and the wire glued on before firing. The enamels compositions and the pigments change with time.

Chinese cloisonné is sometimes confused with Canton enamel, a type of painted enamel on copper that is more closely related to overglaze enamels on Chinese porcelain, or enamelled glass. This is painted on freehand and so does not use partitions to hold the colours separate.

In Byzantine pieces, and even more in Chinese work, the wire by no means always encloses a separate color of enamel. Sometime a wire is used just for decorative effect, stopping in the middle of a field of enamel, and sometimes the boundary between two enamel colors is not marked by a wire. In the Byzantine plaque at right the first feature may be seen in the top wire on the saint's black sleeve, and the second in the white of his eyes and collar. Both are also seen in the Chinese bowl illustrated at top right.

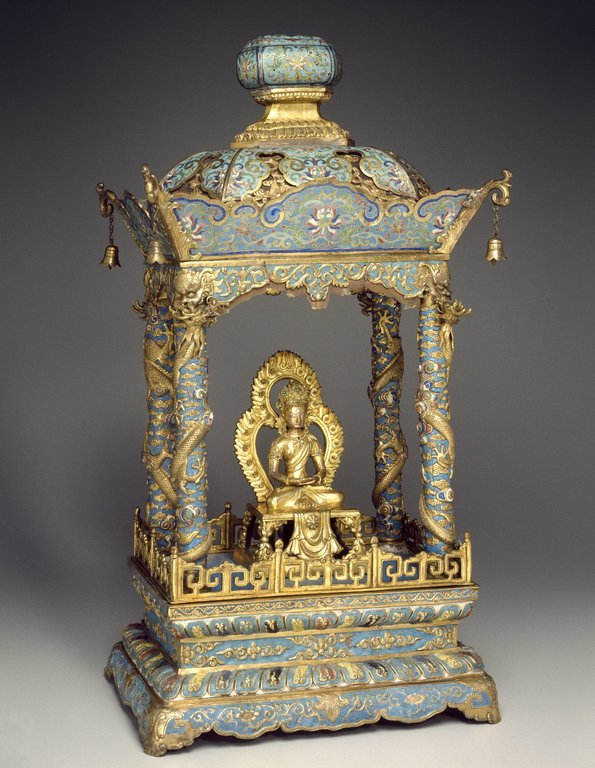
Chinese shrine for a Bodhisattva, 1736–1795. Shrine: Cloisonné enamel on copper alloy; Figure is copper with gems

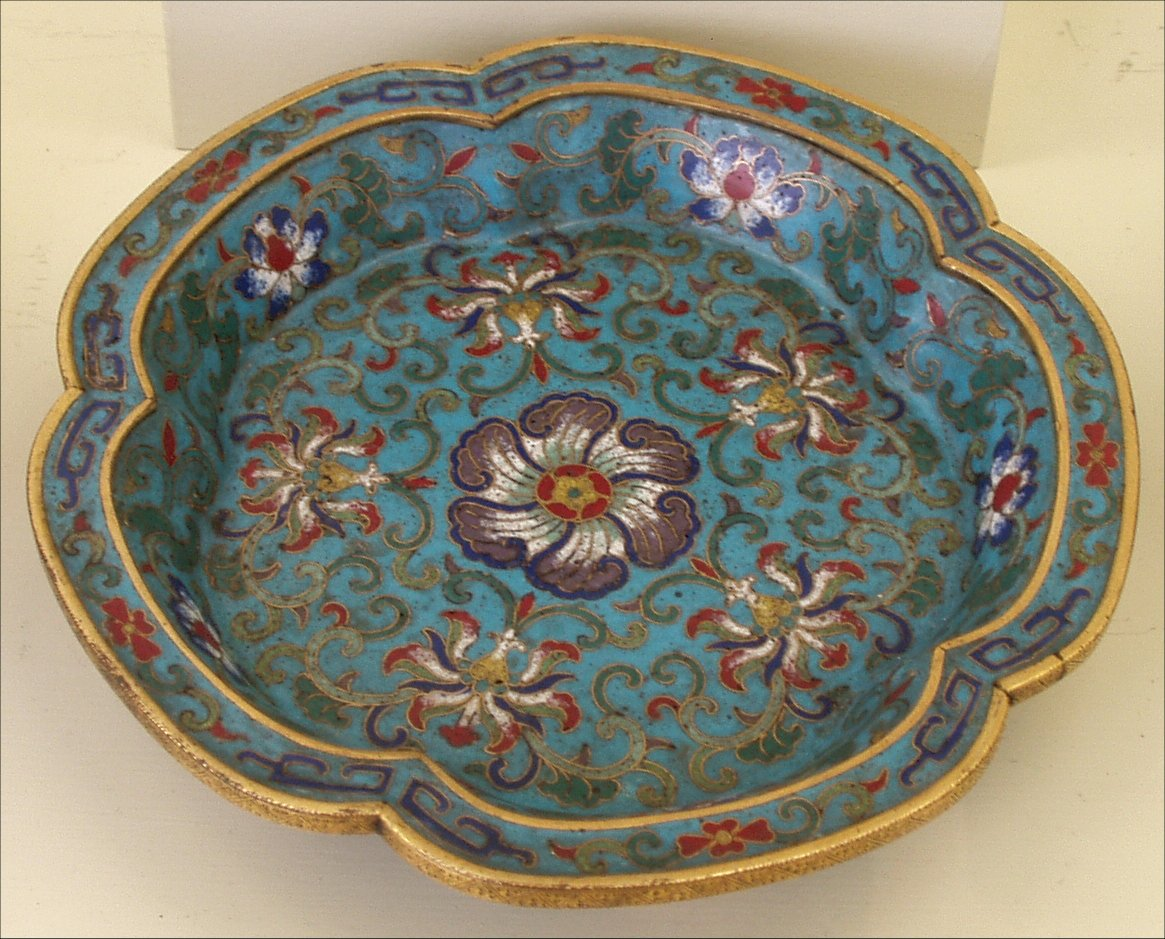
Qing dynasty cloisonné dish

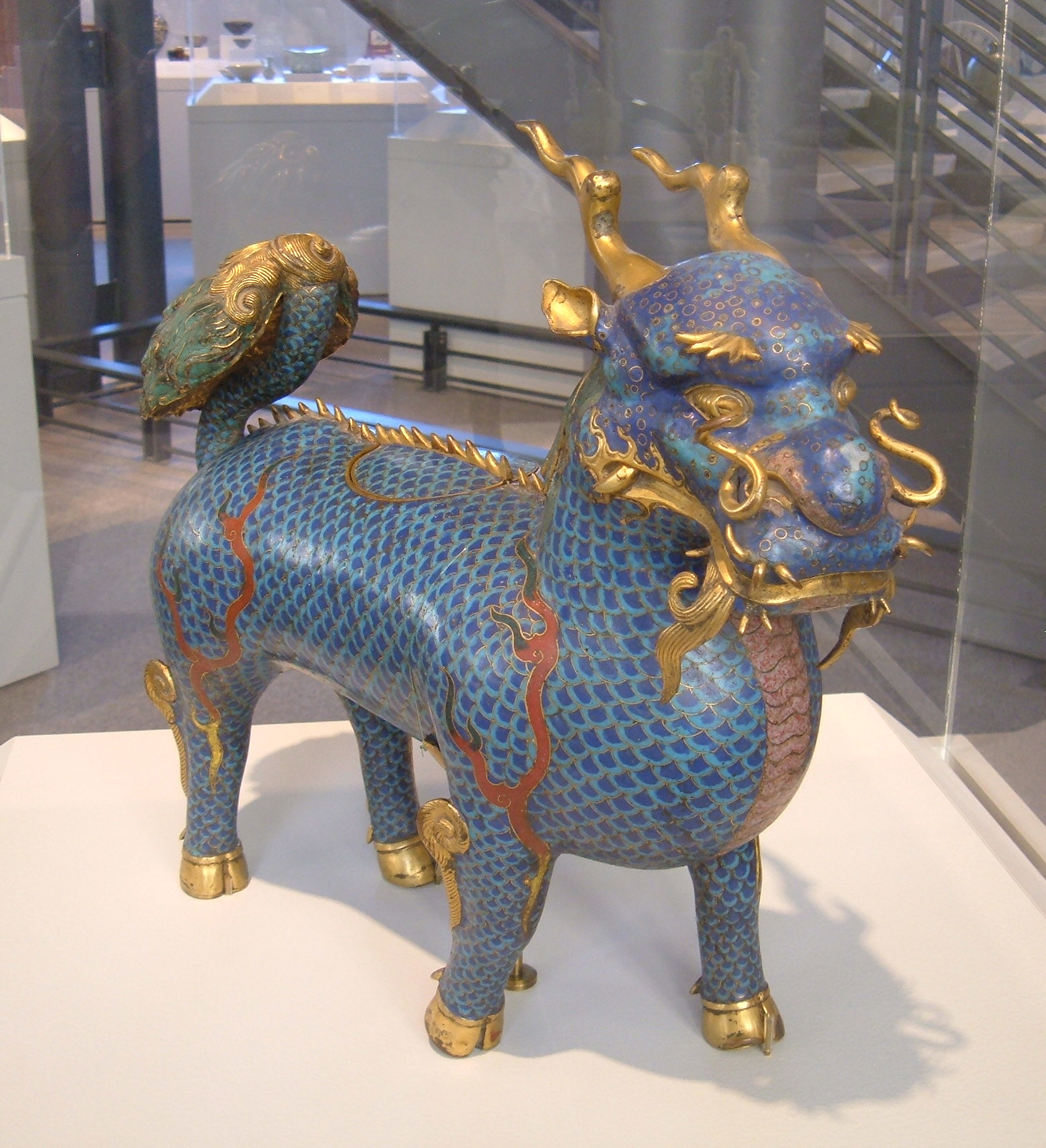
Chinese cloisonné enamel incense burner, 17th-18th centuries

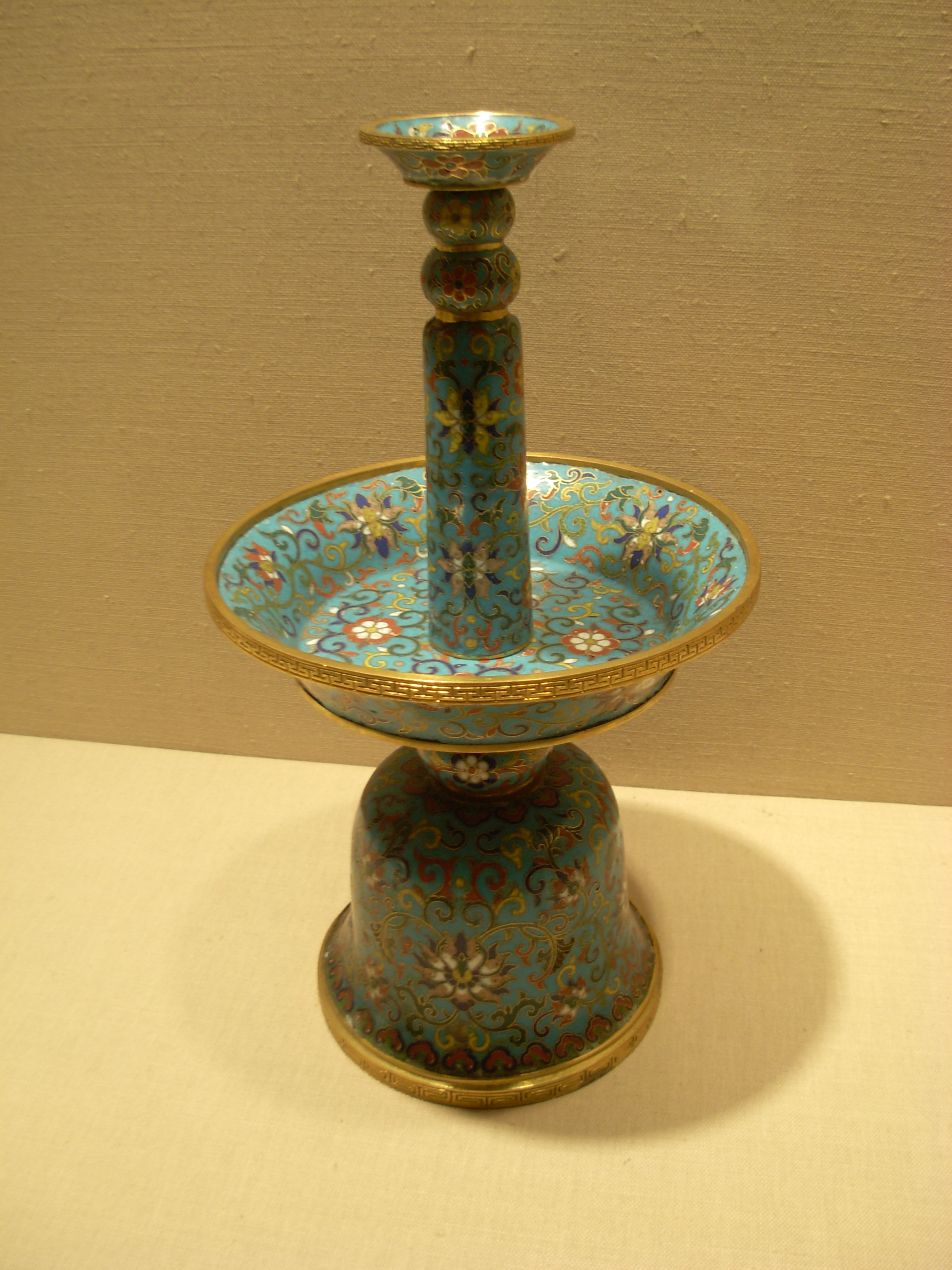
Chinese enameled and gilt candlestick from the 18th or 19th century, Qing dynasty

=== Japan ===
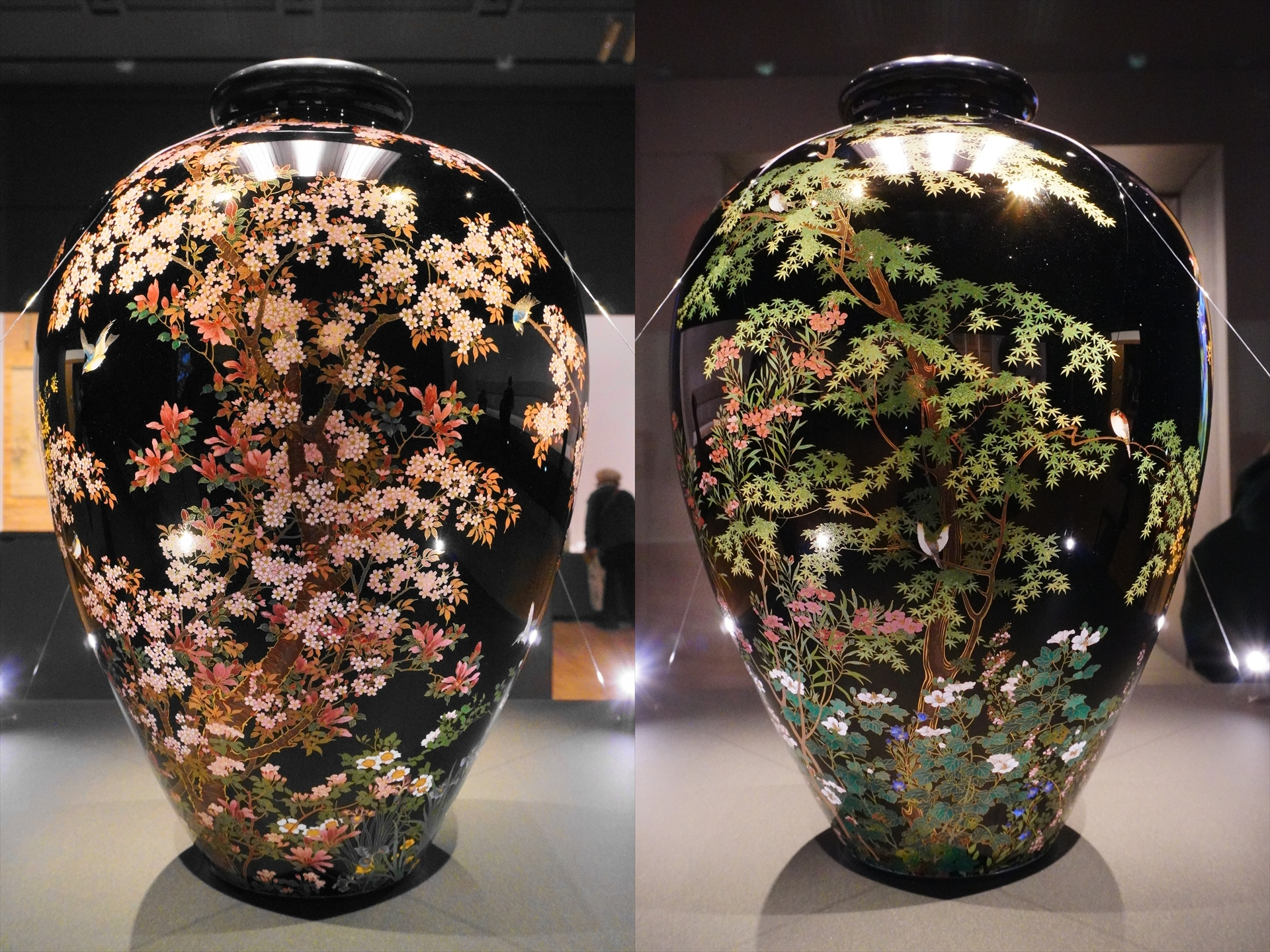
Kyoto cloisonné enamel censer by Namikawa Yasuyuki (1845–1927), Important Cultural Property

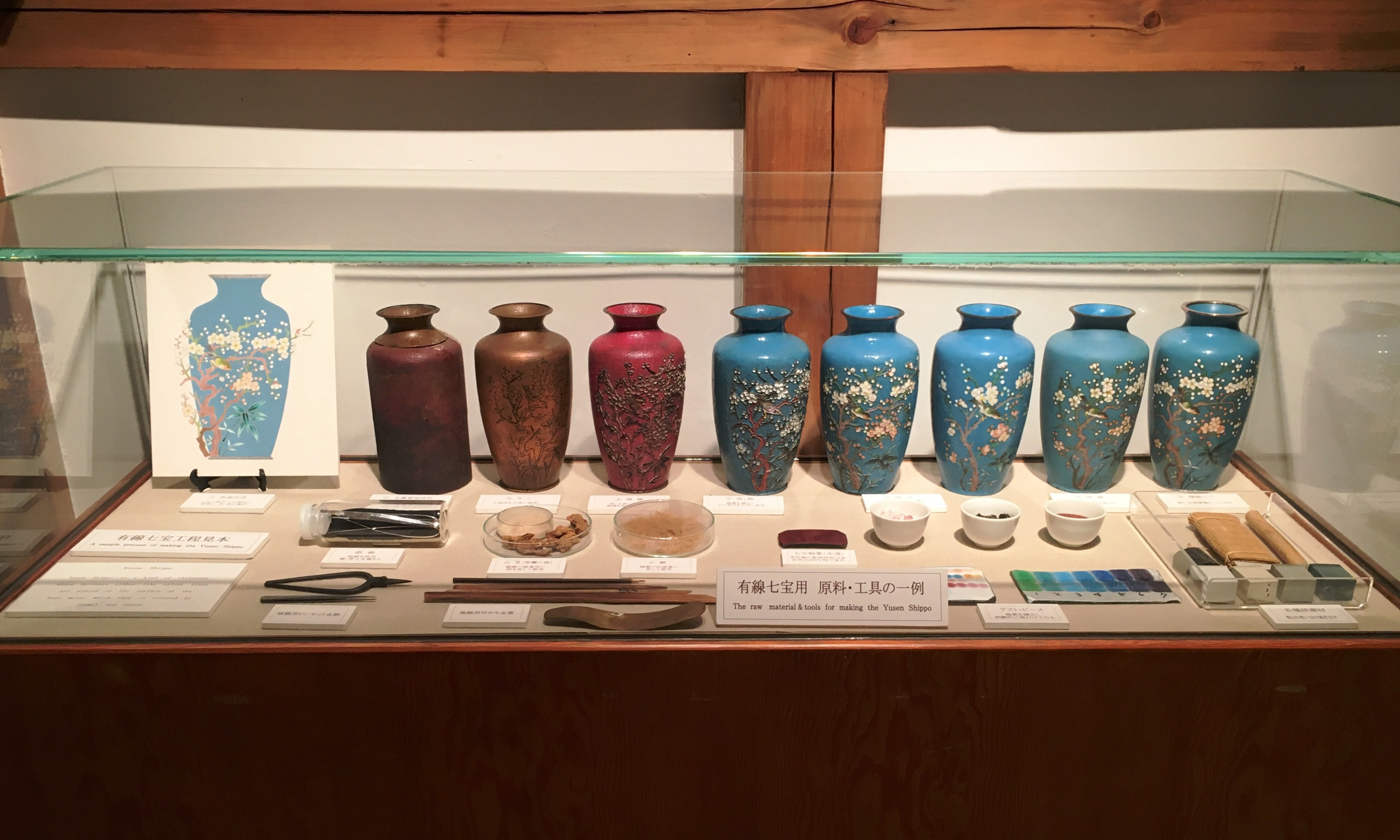
Production process of an enamel vase by Ando Cloisonné Company in Nagoya

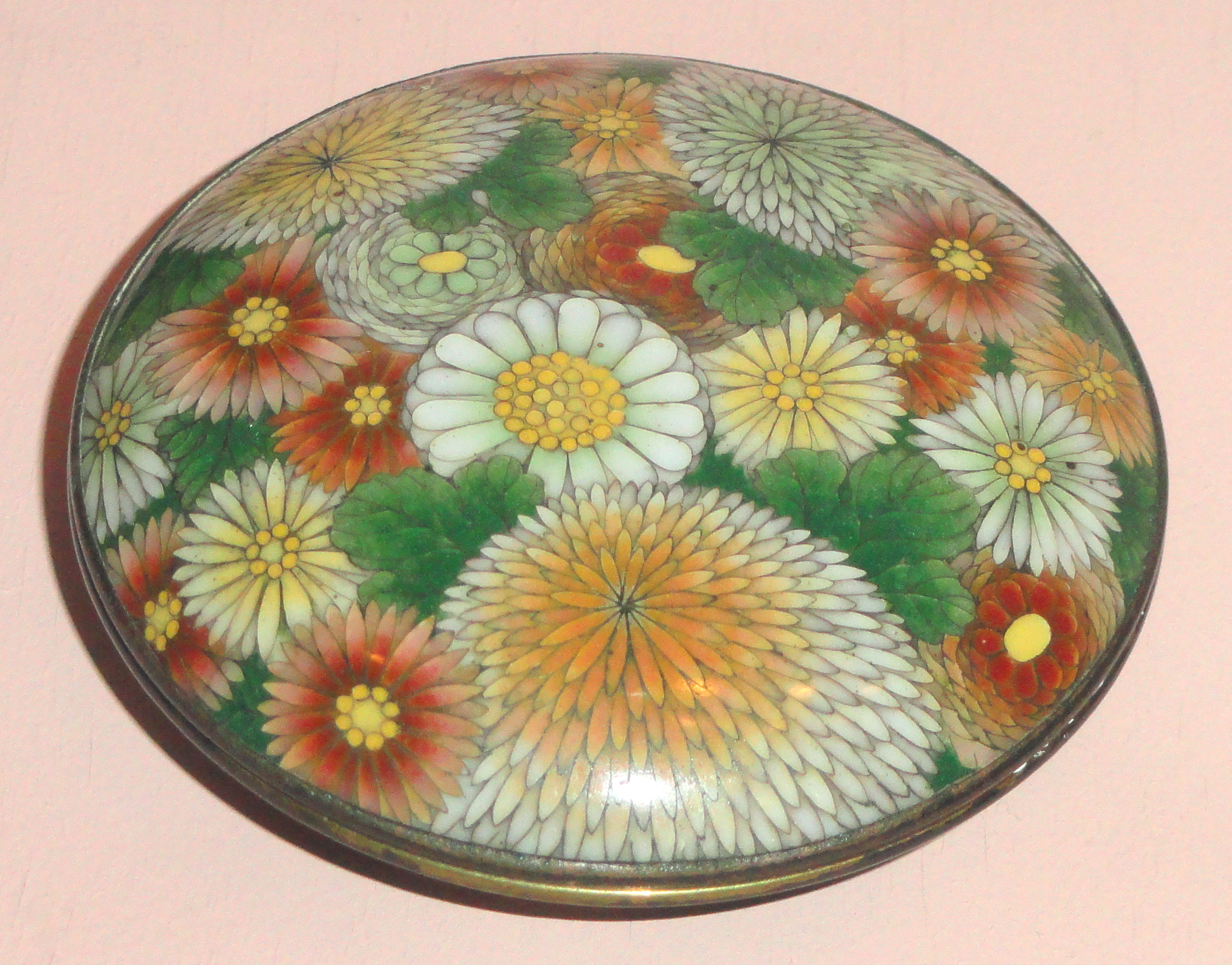
Box by Shibataro Kawada

The Japanese also produced large quantities from the mid-19th century, of very high technical quality. During the Meiji era, Japanese cloisonné enamel reached a technical peak, producing items more advanced than any that had existed before. The period from 1890 to 1910 was known as the "Golden age" of Japanese enamels. An early centre of cloisonné was Nagoya during the Owari Domain, with the Ando Cloisonné Company the leading producer. Later centres were Kyoto and Edo, and Kyoto resident Namikawa Yasuyuki and Tokyo (renamed from Edo) resident Namikawa Sōsuke exhibited their works at World's fair and won many awards. In Kyoto Namikawa became one of the leading companies of Japanese cloisonné. The Namikawa Yasuyuki Cloisonné Museum is specifically dedicated to it. In Japan cloisonné enamels are known as shippō-yaki (七宝焼). Japanese enamels were regarded as unequalled thanks to the new achievements in design and colouring.

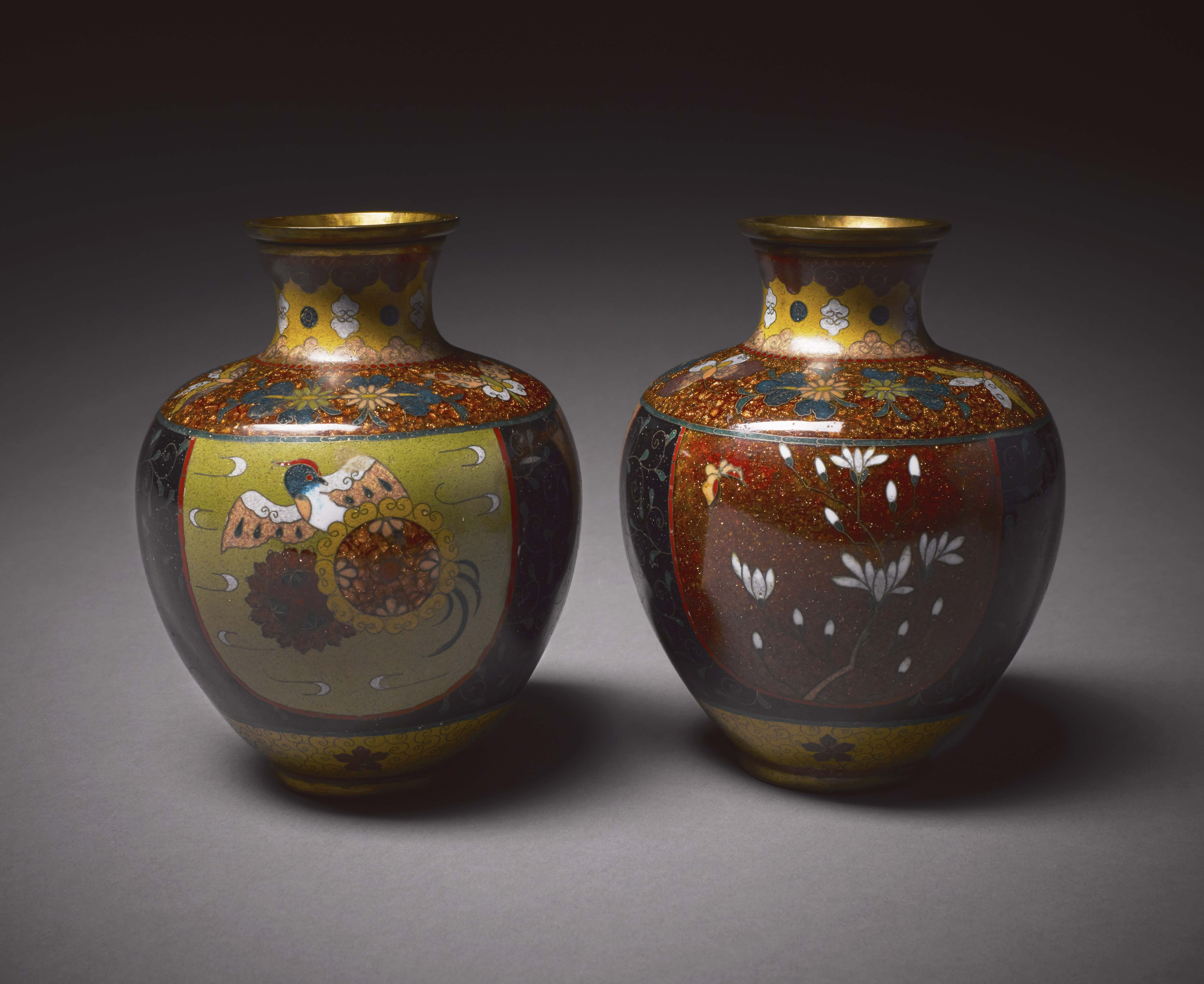
Matching Pair of Cloisonné Vases, c. 1800–1894, from the Oxford College Archives of Emory University

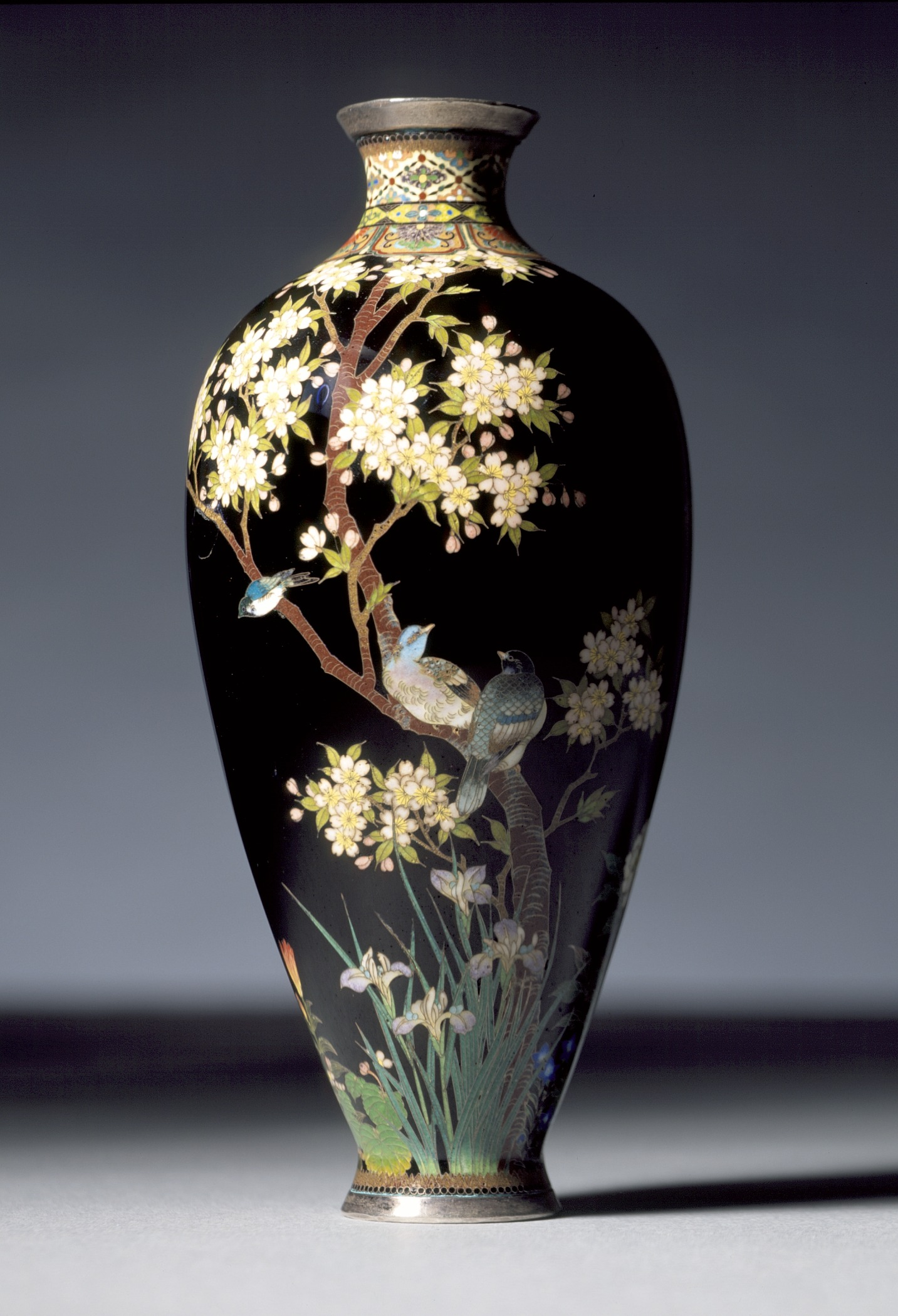
Kyoto Cloisonne Enamel, by Namikawa Yasuyuki (1845–1927)

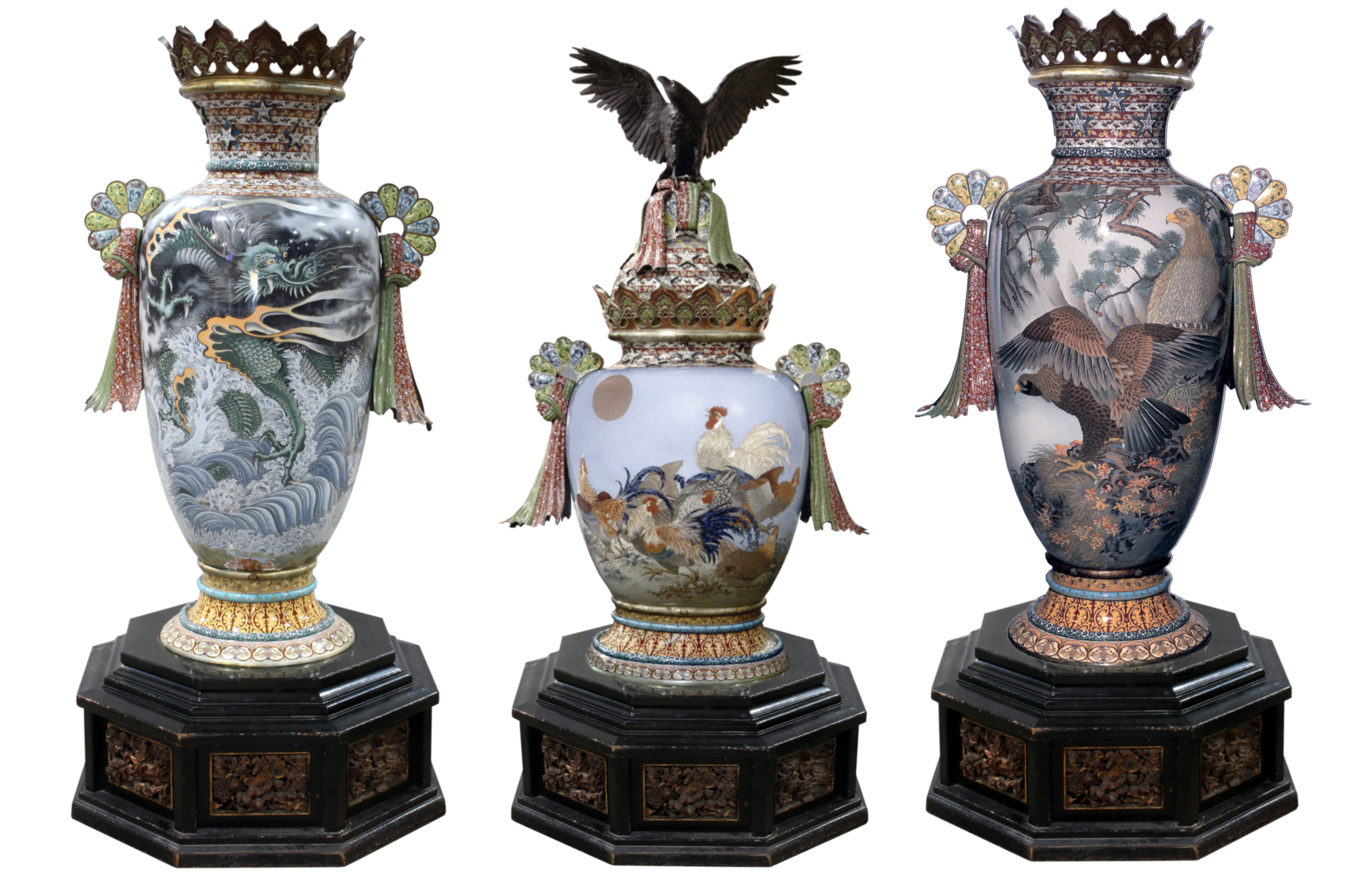
Khalili Imperial Garniture. Meiji period, the largest cloisonné enamel in history at the time and was exhibited at the World's Columbian Exposition in 1893.

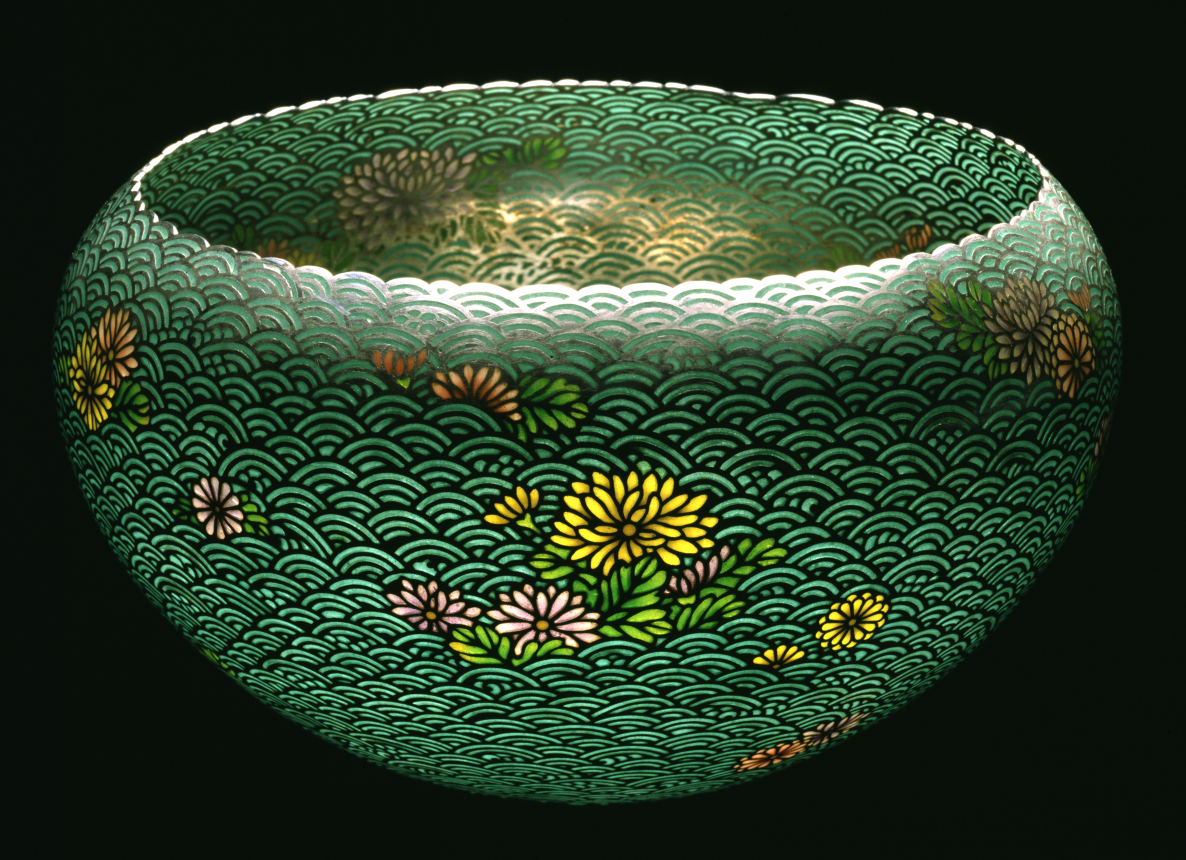
Tokyo Cloisonne Enamel, Shōtai Shippō by Namikawa Sōsuke (c. 1900), translucent plique-a-jour enamel on silver.

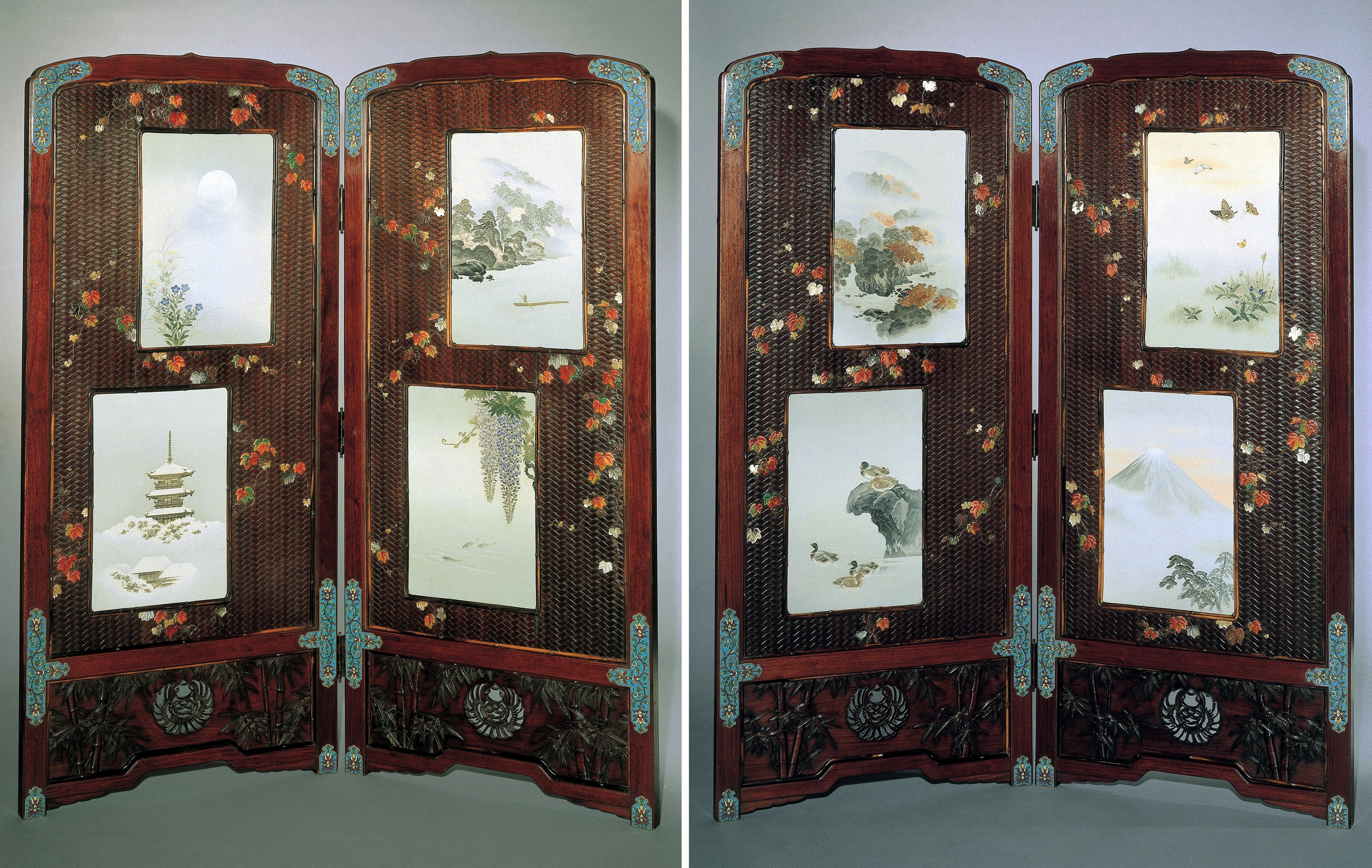
Pair of Two-fold Screens 1900–1905, Nagoya, Japan

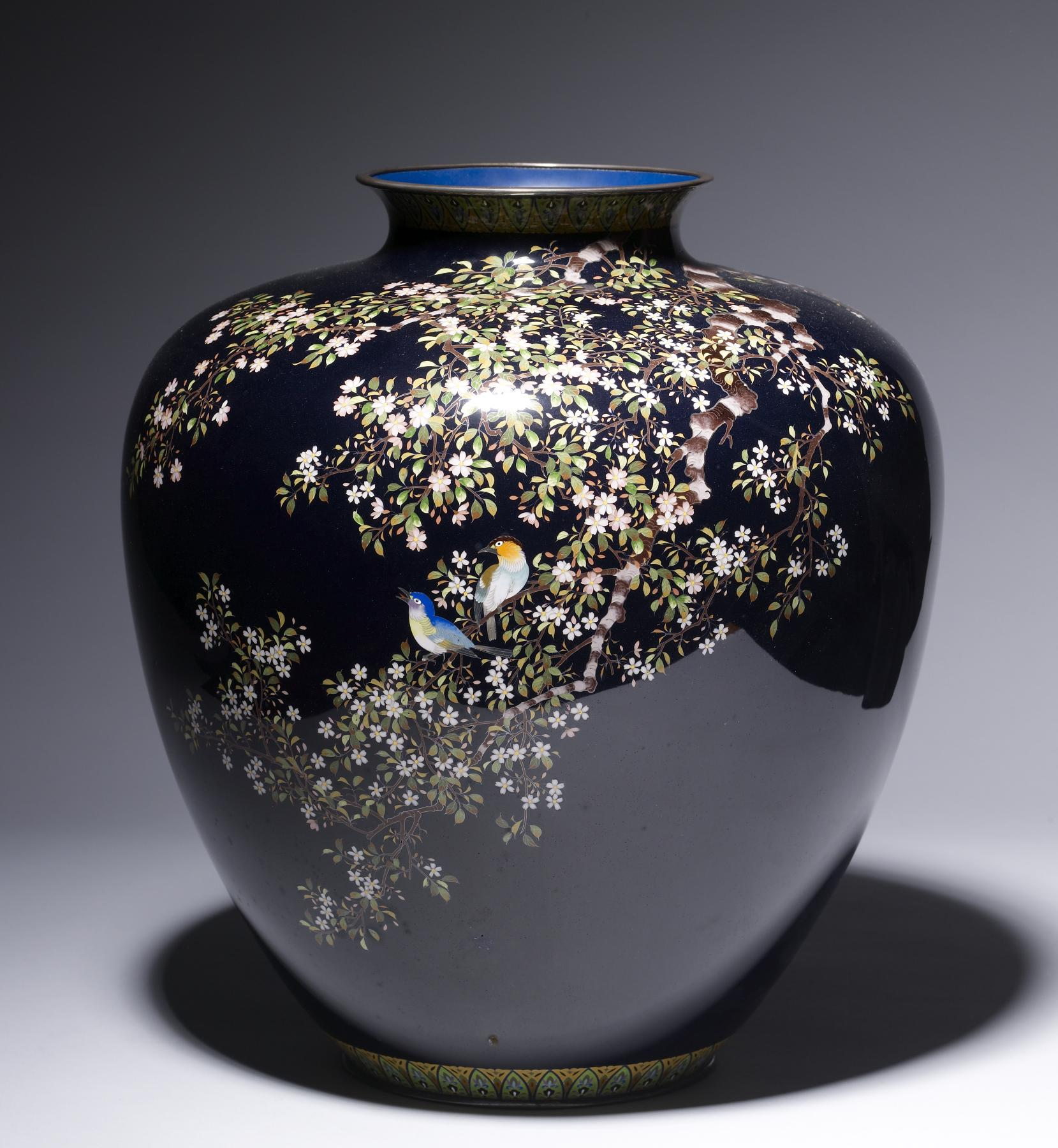
Ando Cloisonné Company, (c. 1910)

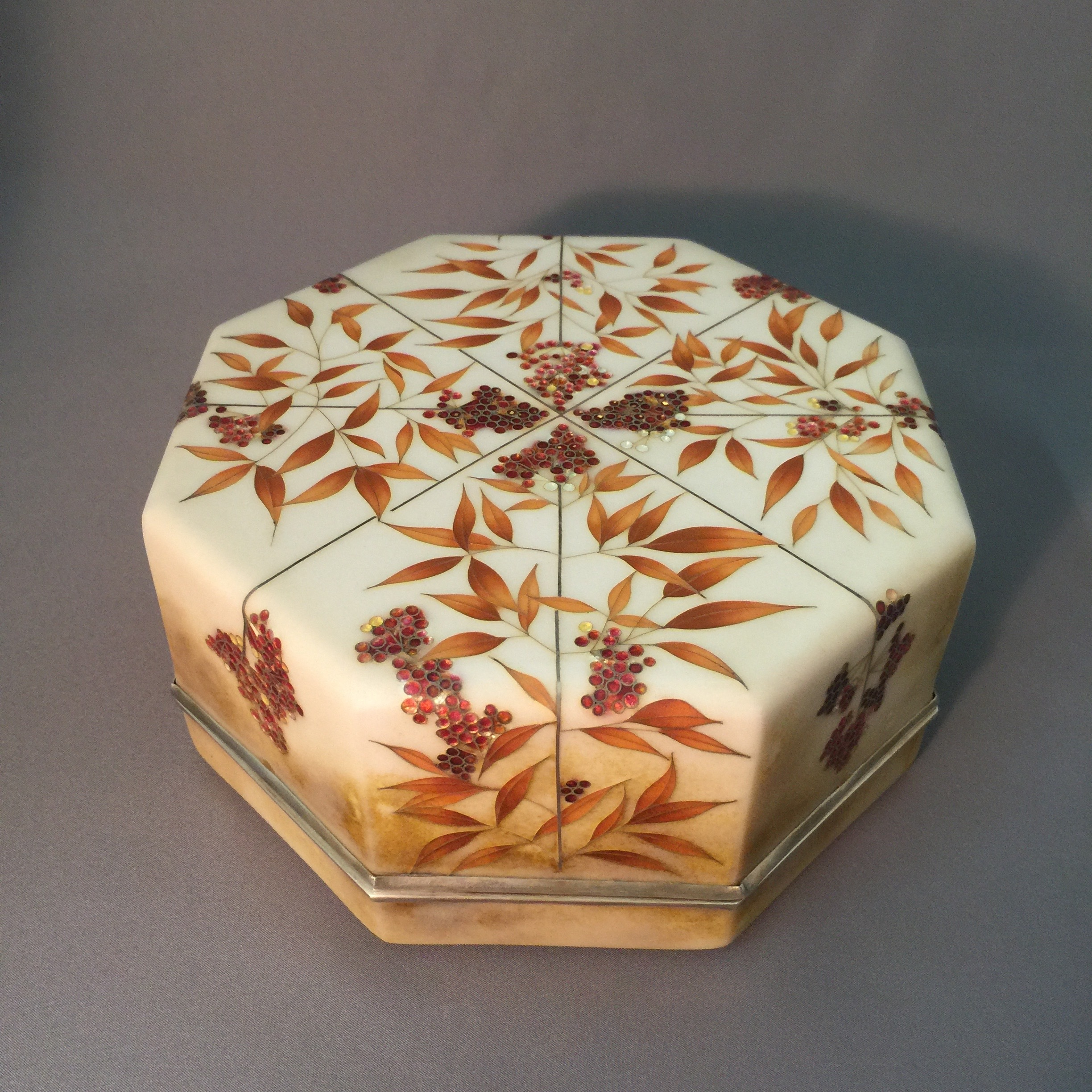
Owari Cloisonne Enamel Octagon by Takemasa Tamura

=== Russia ===
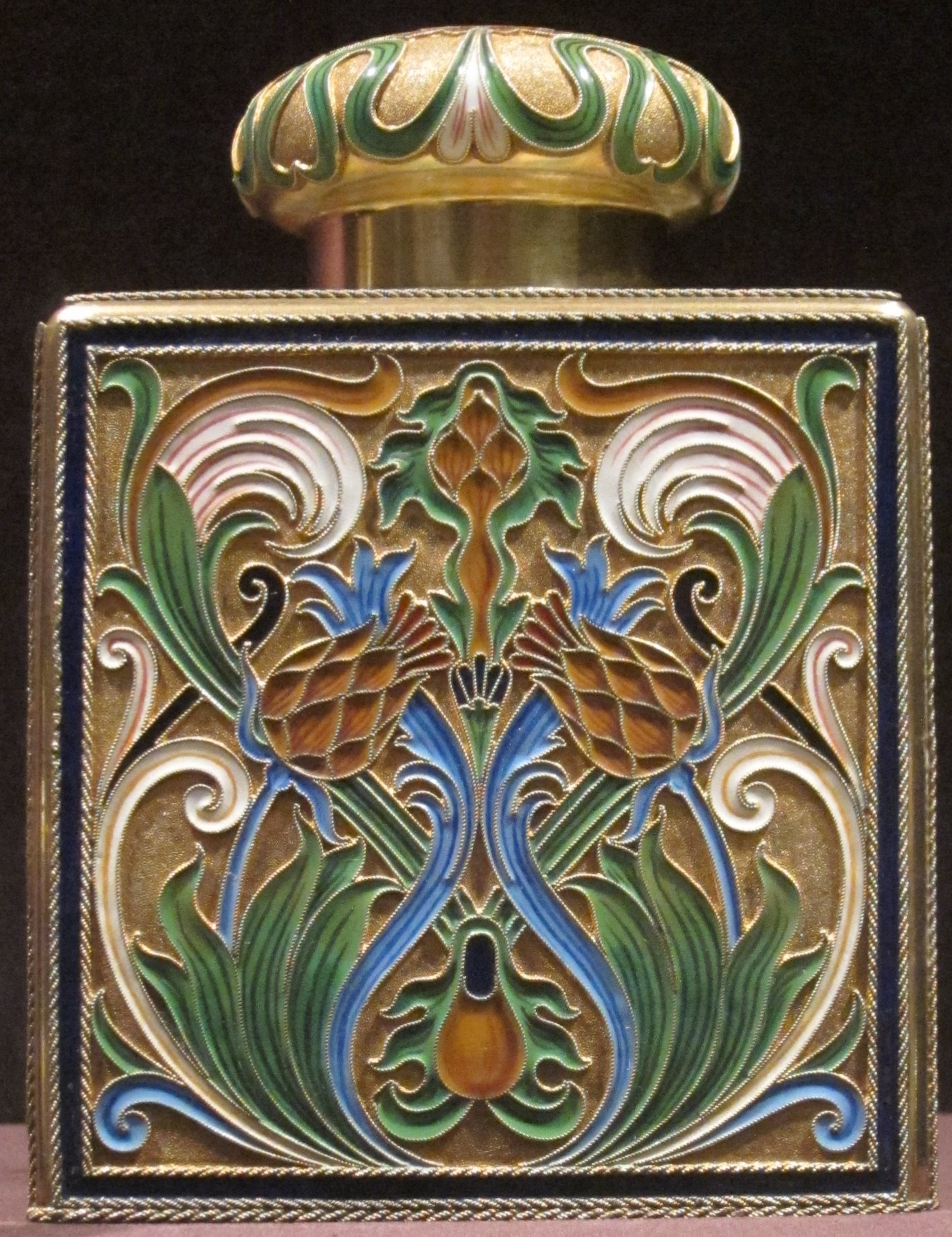
Tea caddy, silver gilt, opaque raised cloisonné enamel, House of Fabergé, Russia, before 1896

The first Russian cloisonné developed from Byzantine models during the period of Kievan Rus, and has mainly survived in religious pieces. Kiev was perhaps the only centre. The industry stopped with the Mongol invasion of Russia but revived in Novgorod by the end of the 14th century, now using champlevé. Cloisonné barely returned until the 19th century, when it was used in revivalist styles by the House of Fabergé and Khlebnikov. Fabergé developed a style of raised and contoured metal shapes rising from the base plate, which were filled, though more thinly than in most cloisonné (effectively painted), leaving the metal edges clear. Russian shaded enamel (or shaded cloisonné) is a celebrated late 19th- and early 20th-century decorative metalwork technique in which artisans blend and fire multiple graduated tones of enamel within single wire-outlined cells (cloisons). Unlike traditional flat cloisonné, this method creates soft, painterly color transitions and rich depth, famously adorning silver-gilt kovshi, spoons, and caskets made by masters like Feodor Rückert, Fabergé, and Khlebnikov.

== Modern process ==
First the object to be decorated is made or obtained; this will normally be made by different craftspeople. The metal usually used for making the body is copper, since it is cheap, light and easily hammered and stretched, but gold, silver or other metals may be used. Cloisonné wire is made from fine silver or fine gold and is usually about.010 x .040 inches (1/4 by 1 mm) in cross section. It is bent into shapes that define the colored areas. The bends are all done at right angles, so that the wire does not curve up. This is done with small pliers, tweezers, and custom-made jigs. The cloisonné wire pattern may consist of several intricately constructed wire patterns that fit together into a larger design. Solder can be used to join the wires, but this causes the enamel to discolour and form bubbles later on. Most existing Byzantine enamels have soldered cloisons, however the use of solder to adhere the cloison wires has fallen out of favor due to its difficulty, with the exception of some "purist contemporary enamellists" who create fine watch faces and high quality very expensive jewelry. Instead of soldering the cloisons to the base metal, the base metal is fired with a thin layer of clear enamel. The cloisonné wire is glued to the enamel surface with gum tragacanth. When the gum has dried, the piece is fired again to fuse the cloisonné wire to the clear enamel. The gum burns off, leaving no residue.

Vitreous enamels in the different colors are ground to fine powders in an agate or porcelain mortar and pestle, then washed to remove the impurities that would discolor the fired enamel. The enamel is made from silica, niter, and lead oxide to which metallic oxides are added for coloring. These ingredients are melted together, forming a glassy frit which is ground again before application. Each color of enamel is prepared this way before it is used and then mixed with a very dilute solution of gum tragacanth. Using fine spatulas, brushes or droppers, the enameler places the fine colored powder into each cloison. The piece is left to dry completely before firing, which is done by putting the article, with its enamel fillings, in a kiln. The enamel in the cloisons will sink down a lot after firing, due to melting and shrinkage of the granular nature of the glass powder, much as sugar melting in an oven. This process is repeated until all cloisons are filled to the top of the wire edge.

Three styles of cloisonné are most often seen: concave, convex, and flat. The finishing method determines this final appearance. With concave cloisonné the cloisons are not completely filled. Capillary action causes the enamel surface to curve up against the cloisonné wire when the enamel is molten, producing a concave appearance. Convex cloissoné is produced by overfilling each cloison, at the last firing. This gives each color area the appearance of slightly rounded mounds. Flat cloisonné is the most common. After all the cloisons are filled the enamel is ground down to a smooth surface with lapidary equipment, using the same techniques as are used for polishing cabochon stones. The top of the cloisonné wire is polished so it is flush with the enamel and has a bright lustre. Some cloisonné wire is electroplated with a thin film of gold, which will not tarnish as silver does.

== Examples ==
=== Enamel ===
- The 8th-century Irish Ardagh Chalice
- The Alfred Jewel, a 9th-century Anglo-Saxon ornament
- The Khakhuli triptych, a large gold altarpiece with over 100 Georgian and Byzantine plaques, dating from the 8th to 12th centuries, said to be the largest enamelled work of art in the world.
- The eyes of the 10th century Golden Madonna of Essen
- The 12th century Mosan Stavelot Triptych, combining cloisonné and champlevé work.
- The Khalili Imperial Garniture from late 19th century Japan

=== Gems and glass ===
- The Pectoral of Tutankhamun, (image), and several others.
- The 5th century grave goods of Childeric I, last pagan king of the Franks, died c. 481
- The 5th-century Germanic Treasure of Pouan
- The 6th-century Merovingian Treasure of Gourdon

== Collections ==
Collections of Japanese cloisonné enamels are held at major museums including the Victoria and Albert Museum in London, the Metropolitan Museum of Art in New York, and the Los Angeles County Museum of Art. The Namikawa Yasuyuki Cloisonné Museum in Kyoto is dedicated to the technique. A collection of 150 Chinese cloisonné pieces is at the G.W. Vincent Smith Art Museum in Springfield, Massachusetts. The Khalili Collection of Japanese Meiji Art includes 107 cloisonné enamel art works, including many works by Namikawa Yasuyuki, Namikawa Sosuke, and Ando Jubei. Researchers have used the collection to establish a chronology of the development of Japanese enamelling.

== Gallery ==
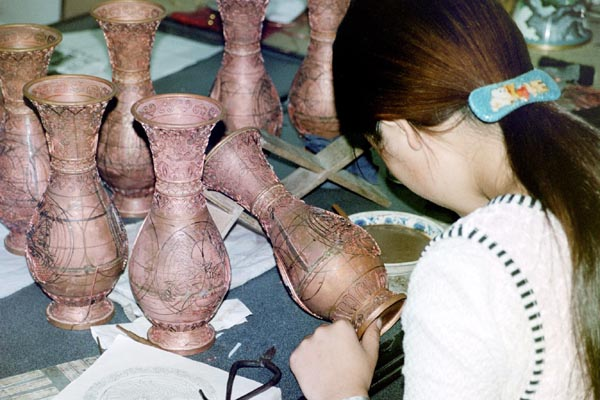
Adding cloisons according to the pattern previously transferred to the workpiece

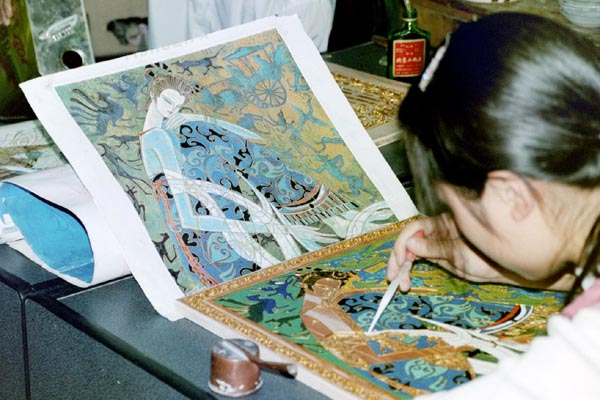
Adding frit with dropper after sintering cloisons. Upon completion the piece will be fired, then ground (repeating as necessary) then polished and electroplated

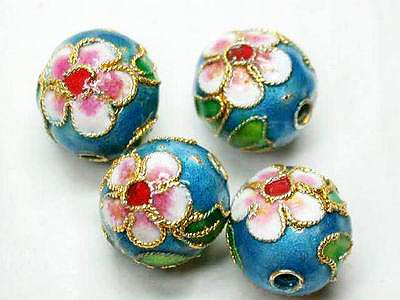
Modern cloisonné enamel beads

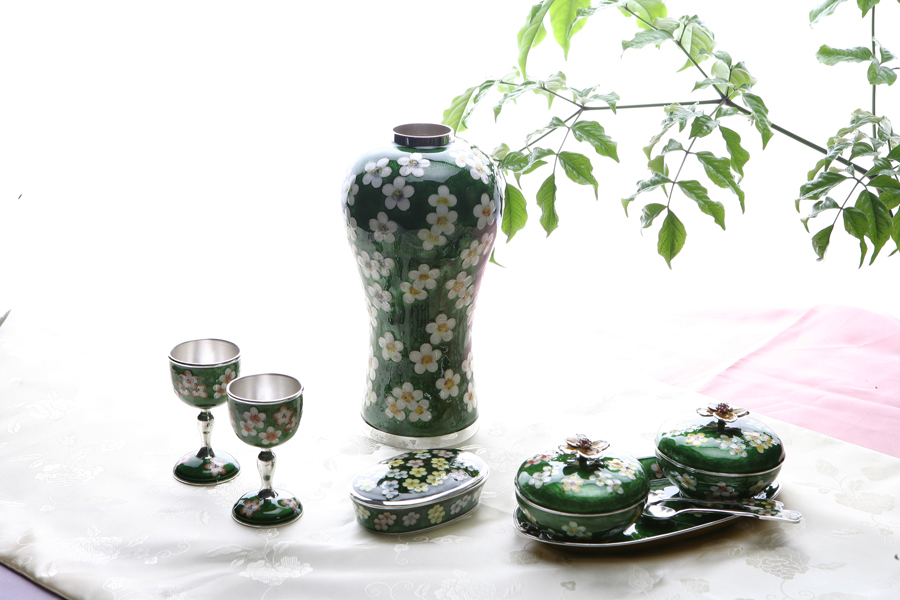
Cloisonné artwork of Korea (namjung cloisonné)

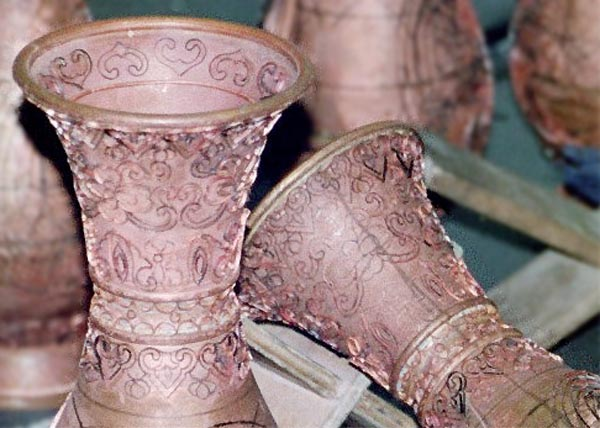
Detail showing pattern and partially completed cloisons

== See also ==
- Champlevé, enamelling into hollows made in a metal surface
- Polychrome vitreous enamel, where the glass is melted onto the object, is also done without separating wires.
- Yūzen, a similar technique for dying cloth, with pools of dye between ridges of temporary resist paste
