= Khlebnikov (firm) =

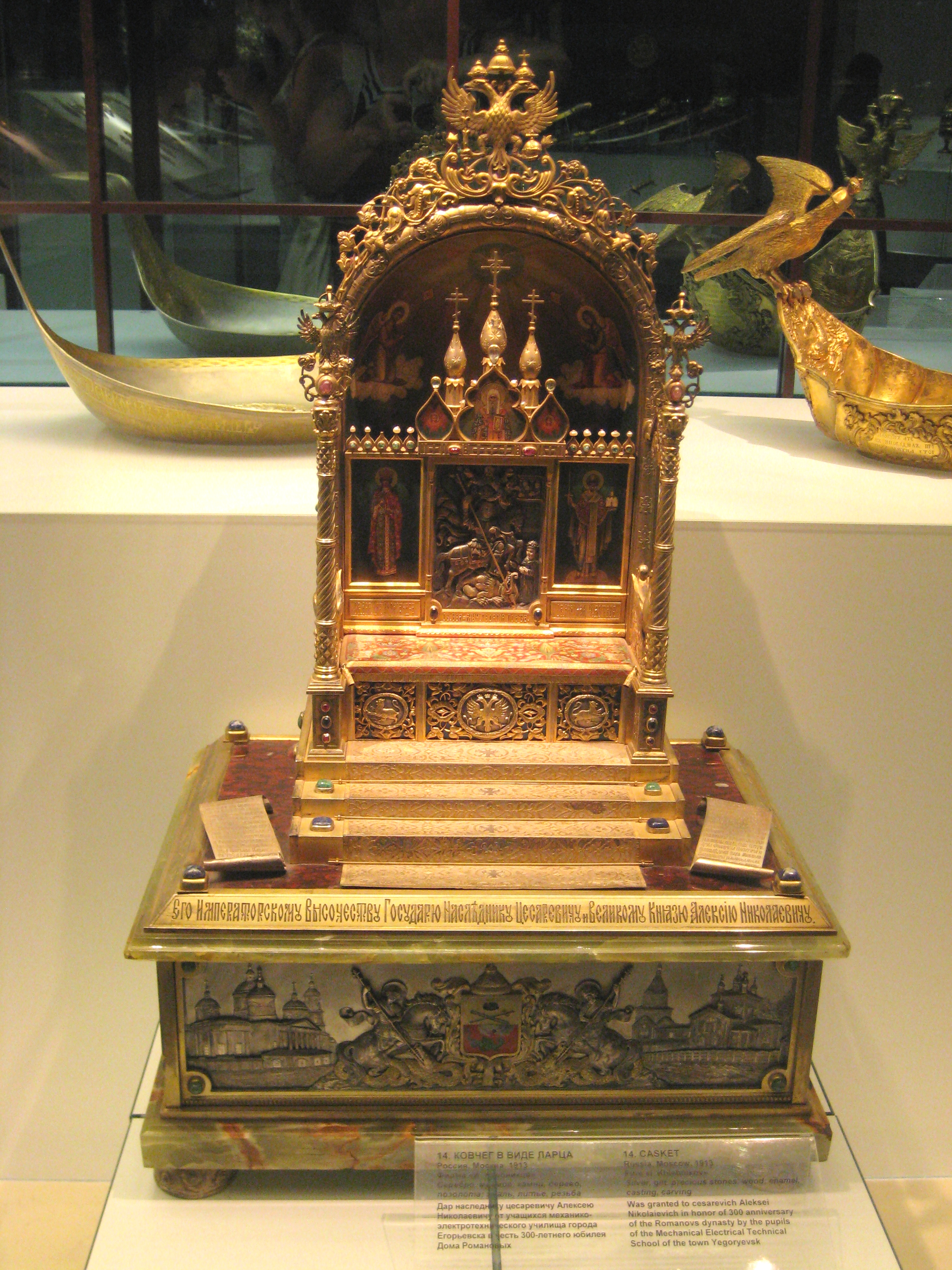
Khlebnikov casket, 1913

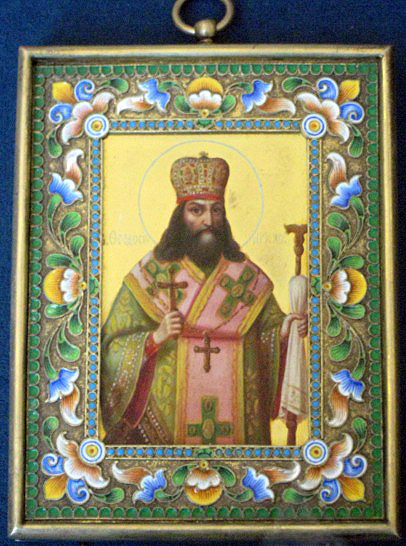
Enamelled frame for small icon

Khlebnikov was an Imperial Russian jewelry firm, founded ca. 1867 by Ivan Khlebnikov in Saint Petersburg, but transferred to Moscow in 1871.

The business was highly successful and received the Imperial Warrant, producing work of originality and highest quality using decoration in the traditional Russian style on many pieces. Enamel was a speciality, especially plique-à-jour, but also cloisonné. Demand for its work was high and in 1882 it employed 200 craftsmen. The business succumbed at the time of the Russian Revolution.

== Awards ==
- 1873 – two medals at the World Exhibition in Vienna
- 1889 – Gold medal at the Paris Exposition

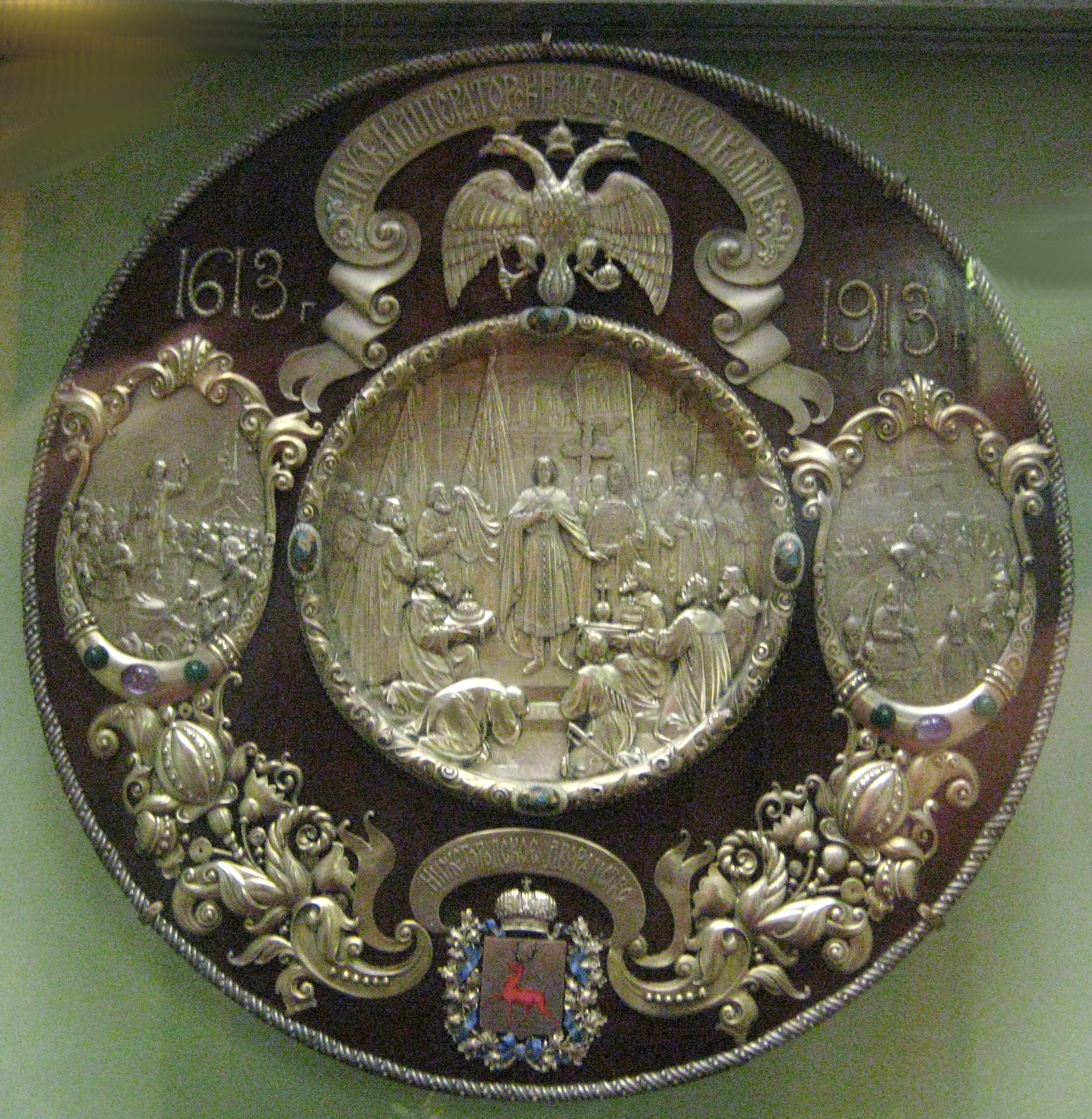
Romanov anniversary dish, 1913
