= Khalili Imperial Garniture =

Trio of enamel artworks

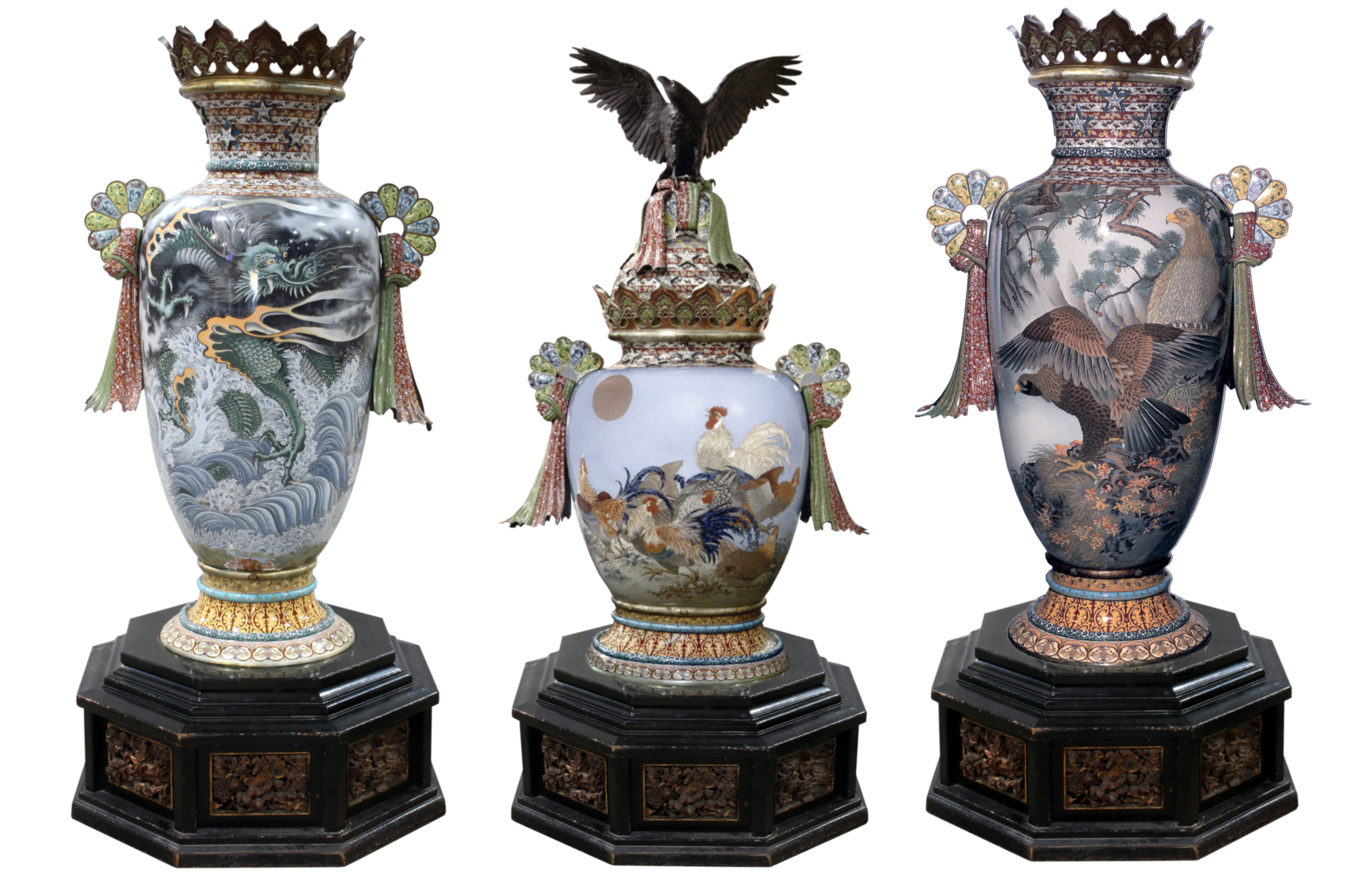
- Artist: Shirozayemon Suzuki, Seizayemon Tsunekawa, Araki Kanpo
- Year: 1893
- Medium: Cloisonné enamel on copper
- Dimensions: 172 cm (68 in)
- Owner: Nasser Khalili
- Accession: E10, EX439, EX512

The Khalili Imperial Garniture is a trio of cloisonné vases created for a Japanese Imperial commission during the Meiji era. The items were exhibited at the World's Columbian Exposition in Chicago, United States, in 1893, where they were described as "the largest examples of cloisonné enamel ever made". The decoration of the vases represents virtues and the seasons, and also has an allegorical meaning about Japan's role in a changing world and its alliance with the United States. After being exhibited, the vases were separated from each other for more than 120 years, eventually reunited in 2019 in the Khalili Collection of Japanese Art, a private collection assembled by the British collector and scholar Nasser D. Khalili.

== Creation and exhibition ==
During Japan's Meiji era (1868 to 1912), the government actively promoted Japanese arts and crafts abroad by exhibiting the best examples in the world's fairs that were held in America and Europe. The first world's fair to exhibit Japanese art works in its Fine Arts section was the World's Columbian Exposition and among them was this garniture with a central incense burner. It had been inspected by the emperor who approved it for the exhibition. The three vases are decorated with enamel and silver wire on a copper surface. At the exposition they were described as "the largest examples of cloisonné enamel ever made". The eight feet, eight inches (264 cm) height quoted in the 1893 catalogue includes their pedestals made of keyaki wood. The height of the tall vases is 172 cm (five feet, eight inches). The incense burner is topped by an eagle in bronze.

A team of craftsmen, led by Shirozayemon Suzuki of Yokohama and Seizayemon Tsunekawa of Nagoya, took more than four years to construct the three items. The painting was done by nihonga artist Araki Kanpo (1831–1915) who was a member of the Japanese Imperial Household's art committee and of the Royal Society of Arts, London. Kanpo was later recognised in 1900 as an Imperial Household Artist. Viewing the garniture in Tokyo before its shipping to Chicago, the Anglo-Irish scholar Francis Brinkley predicted that the exposition would not display it in the Palace of Fine Arts because of its political symbolism. Despite this prediction, it was displayed prominently in the East Court of the Palace as the ethnologist Hubert Howe Bancroft describes in his Book of the Fair.

== Decoration and symbolism ==
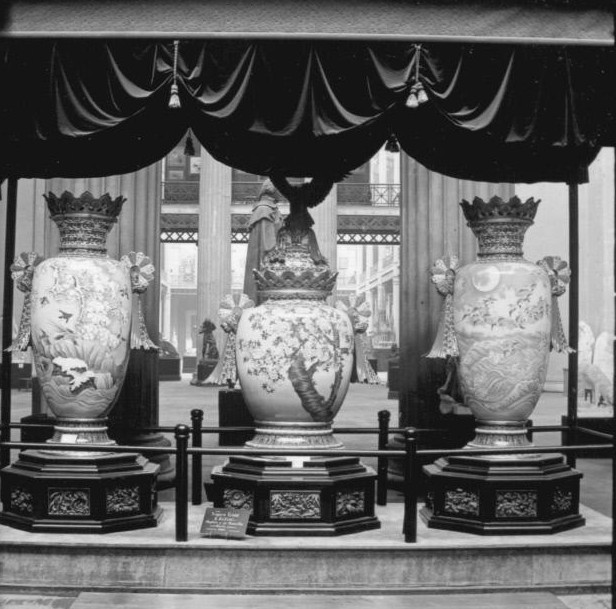
The garniture on display in Chicago in 1893

The idea for the design is credited to "Mr. Shin Shiwoda, Special Counsellor for the Arts of the Japanese Commission for the World's Columbian Exposition". The three vases depict a dragon, chickens, and eagles, respectively representing the virtues of wisdom, honesty and strength. The imagery also has a geographical meaning, with the dragon representing China, the eagles Russia, a rising sun for Japan, chickens for the Korean Islands and the bronze eagle on the central censer representing the United States. The handles of the censer are shaped like chrysanthemums, the symbol of the Japanese Imperial family. The general design also includes the four seasons of the year, with opposite sides of one vase showing autumn and winter scenes. The eagle's appearance on a winter background, driving other birds before it, represents Russia's advance into East Asia. The dragon representing China is depicted among summer clouds, heading towards autumn. The reverse of this vase depicts plover over waves. Japan's rising sun appears in a spring scene, suggesting "gladness and general revival". The neck of each vase features a striped red and white pattern with inlaid silver stars. The stars and stripes decorated with chrysanthemums and vines symbolise partnership between Japan and the United States.

The Japan Weekly Mail of 15 April 1893 gave this interpretation of the design:

"Russia swooping down upon Korea finds her aggressive designs thwarted by China and Japan, while the Stars and Stripes wave their protecting folds over all; the American eagle spreads its wings above a scene where Korea, rescued and reviving on the threshold of spring, passes into the sunshine and bloom of Japan's early summer; the national flags of the United States and her Oriental friend intertwine everywhere overhead."

The garniture was thus a political statement about how Japan saw its new status in the world, as a land of new beginnings that was emerging as the major regional power, allied with the United States against an encroaching Russia. Events in the two decades after the World's Columbian Exposition unfolded similarly to what was depicted allegorically by the garniture. The First Sino-Japanese war ended with Japan defeating China and gaining control of the Korean peninsula, preventing Russia's advance into that territory. Japan's victory in the Russo-Japanese war made it the first Asian nation to defeat a Western power.

== Collection ==
Among the eight collections assembled, published, and exhibited by London-based collector, scholar and philanthropist Nasser Khalili is a collection of Japanese decorative art of the Meiji era, considered to be only equalled by the collection of the Japanese imperial family. The complete garniture is now part of that collection. Khalili acquired the first vase, depicting eagles, in Los Angeles in the early 1990s. He displayed it at a 1999 exhibition of Meiji art in Wilmington, Delaware in 1999. The incense burner depicting chickens was owned by Hirose Atsushi and displayed at the Tokyo National Museum before being bought by Khalili in 2000. The other vase, depicting a dragon, was considered "lost". In January 2019 it was found to have been the centerpiece of the main dining room of Spenger's Fresh Fish Grotto in Berkeley, California, one of the oldest restaurants in the San Francisco Bay area. Frank Spenger, son of the restaurant's founder, had acquired the vase at the 1894 California Midwinter Fair. On 17 February 2019, Khalili bought it for $110,000 at an auction of Spenger family items, thus reuniting the garniture after more than 120 years.

== Gallery ==
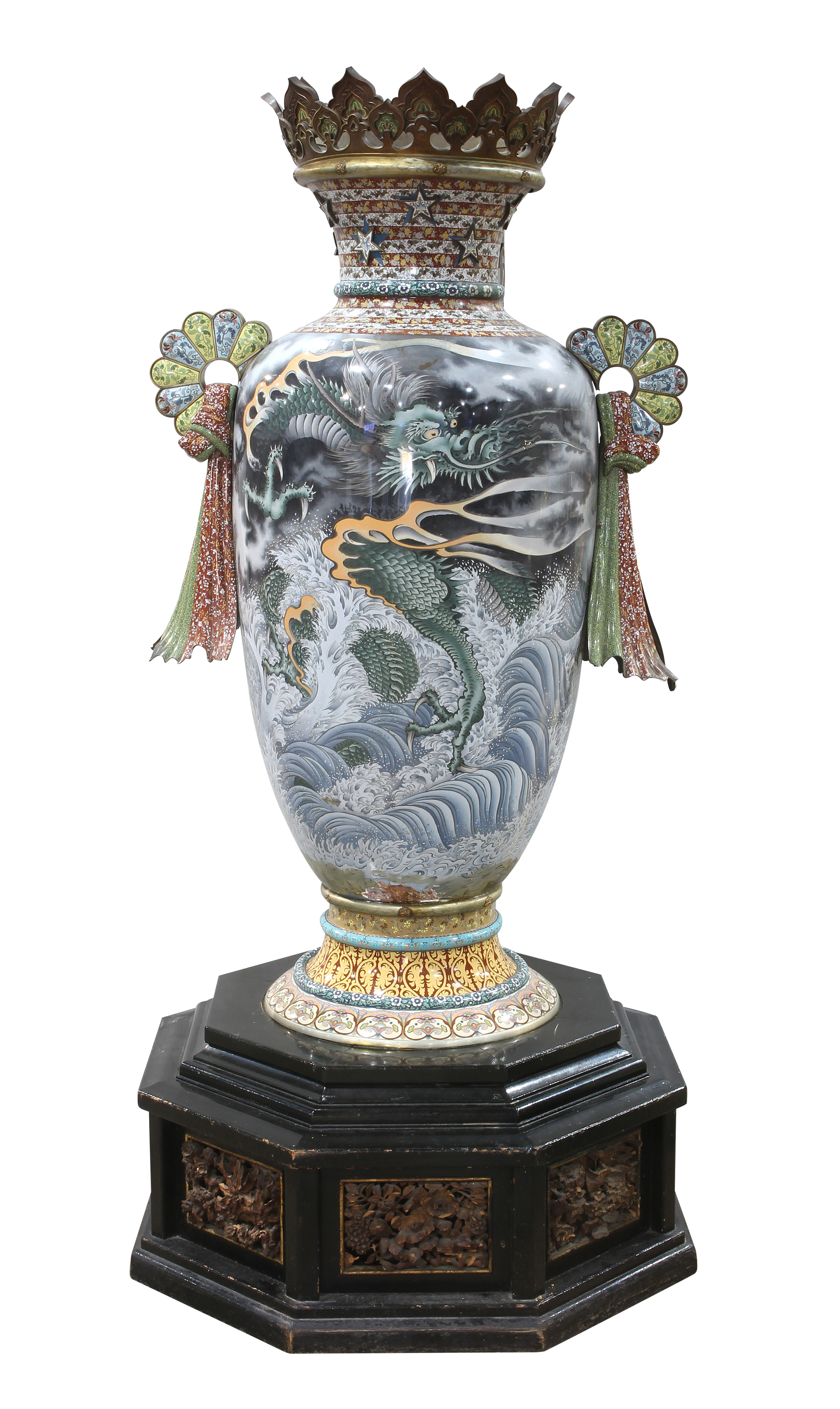

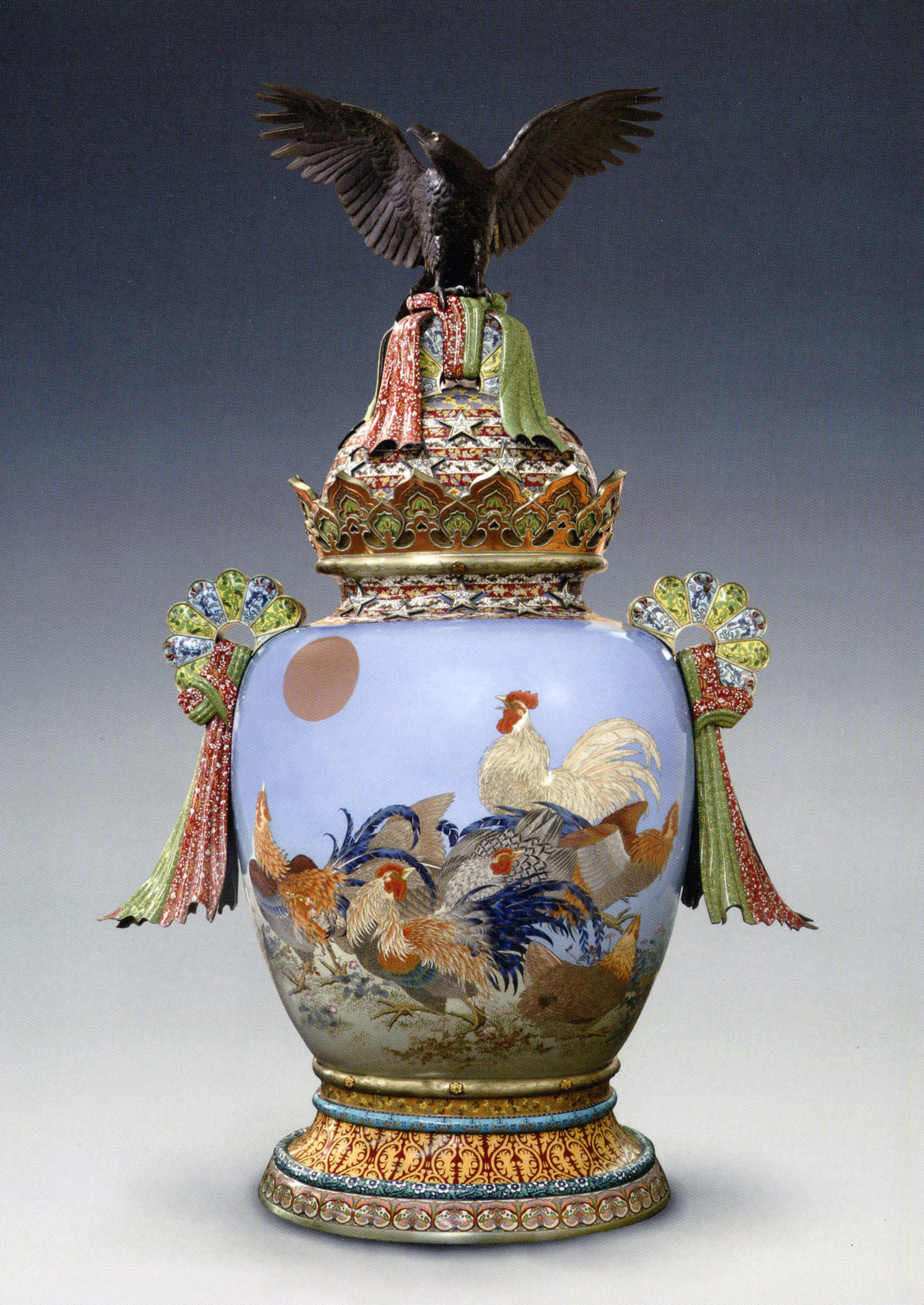

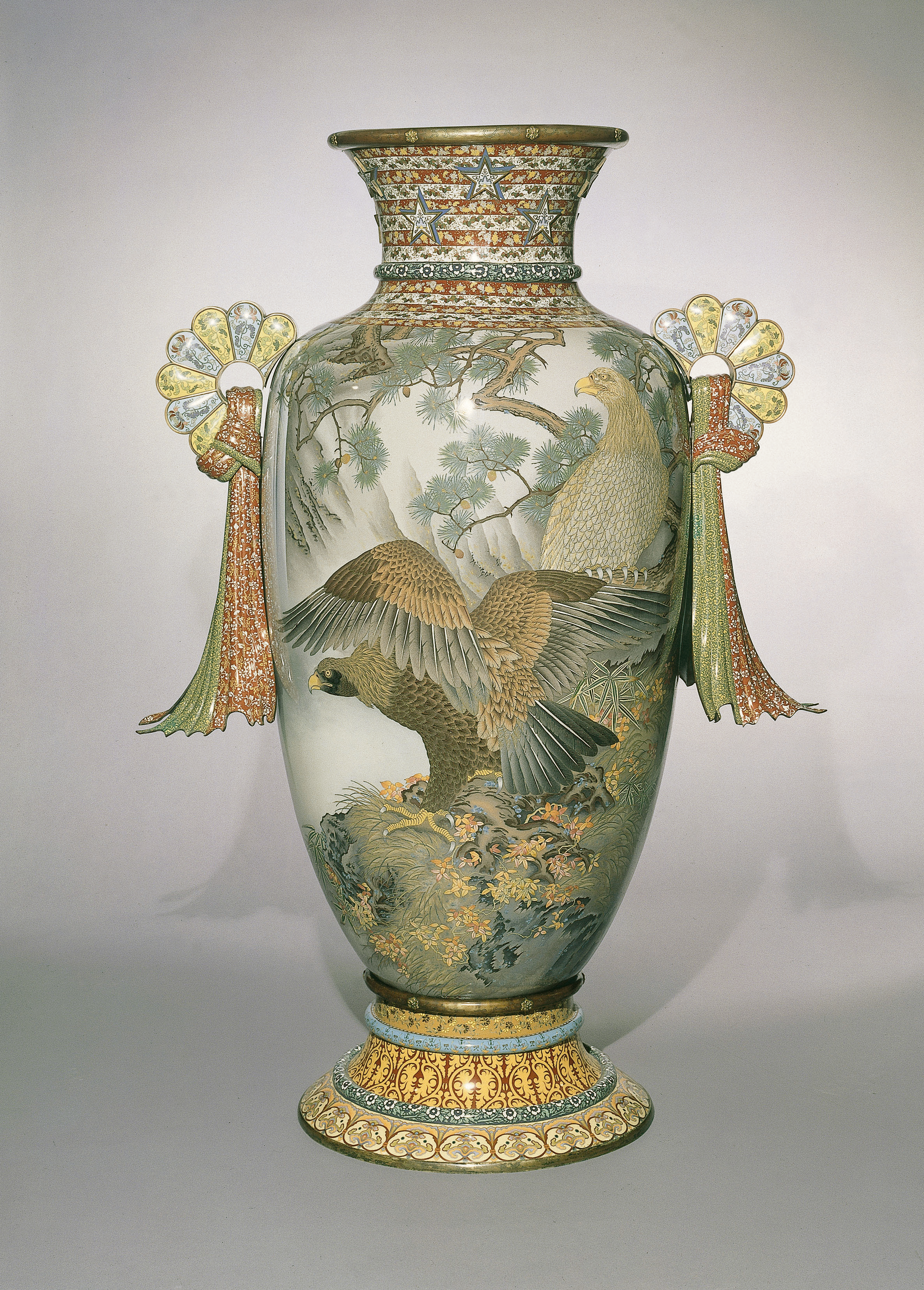
