= Peter Kaufmann =

Peter Kaufmann or Kaufman may refer to:

- Peter Kaufmann (sculptor) (1764–1829), Austrian-born German sculptor
- Peter Kaufmann (Alpine guide) (1858–1924), Swiss mountain guide
- Peter Kaufmann (politician) (born 1947), businessman and former municipal politician in Winnipeg, Manitoba, Canada
- Peter Kaufmann (philosopher), American philosopher
- Peter Iver Kaufman, American philosopher
- Peter S. Kaufman, American investment banker
