= Angelica Facius =

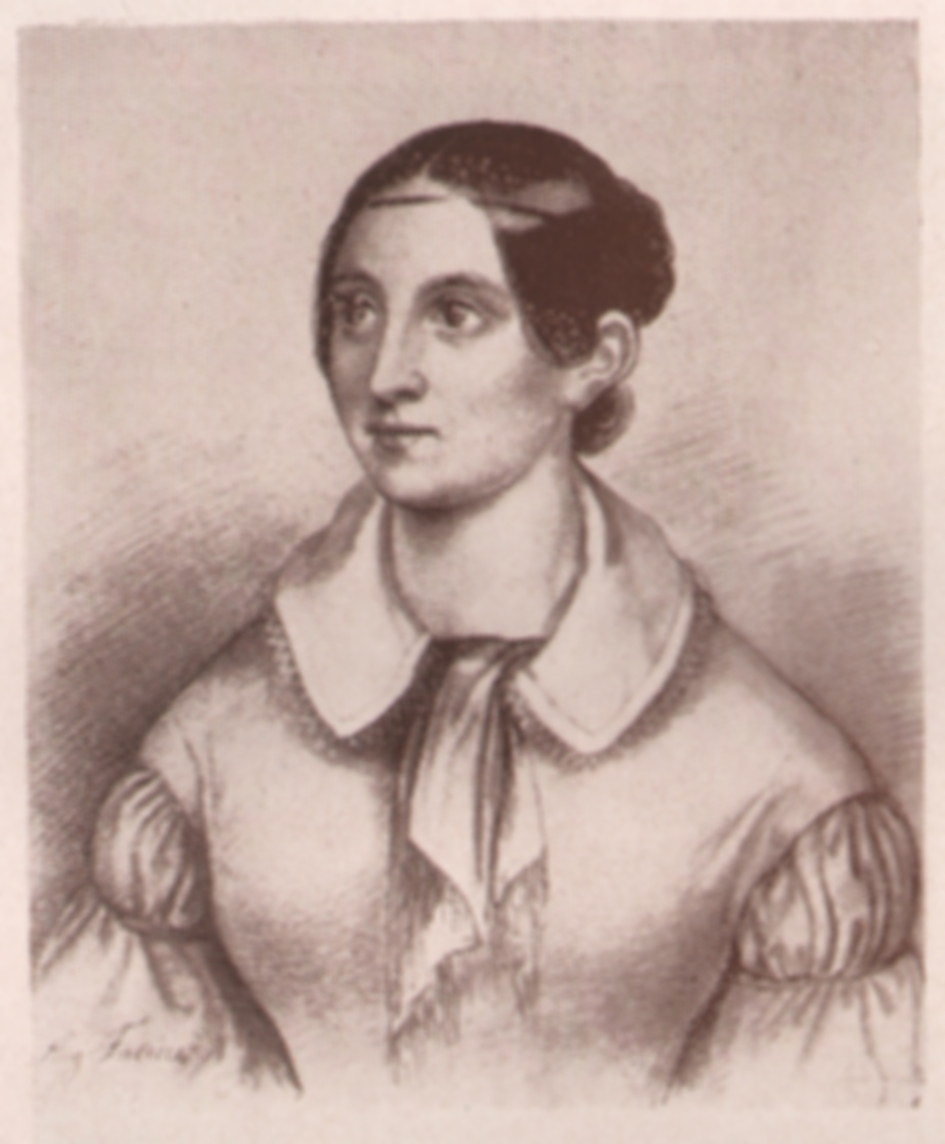
Angelica Facius, portrait by Louise Seidler (1842)

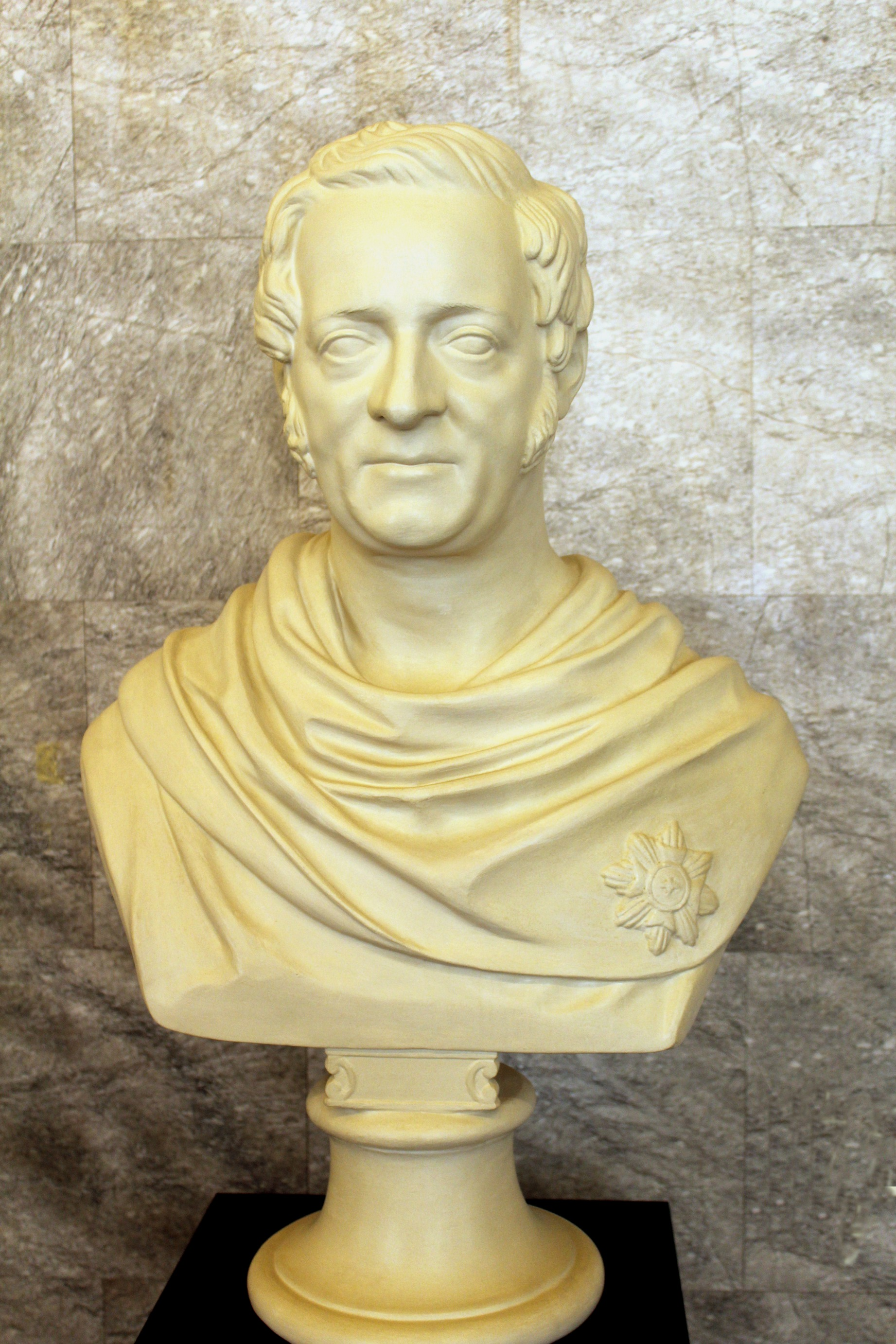
Bust of Grand Duke Charles Frederick

Angelica Bellonata Facius (13 October 1806, Weimar – 17 April 1887, Weimar) was a German sculptor, gem engraver, and medallist.

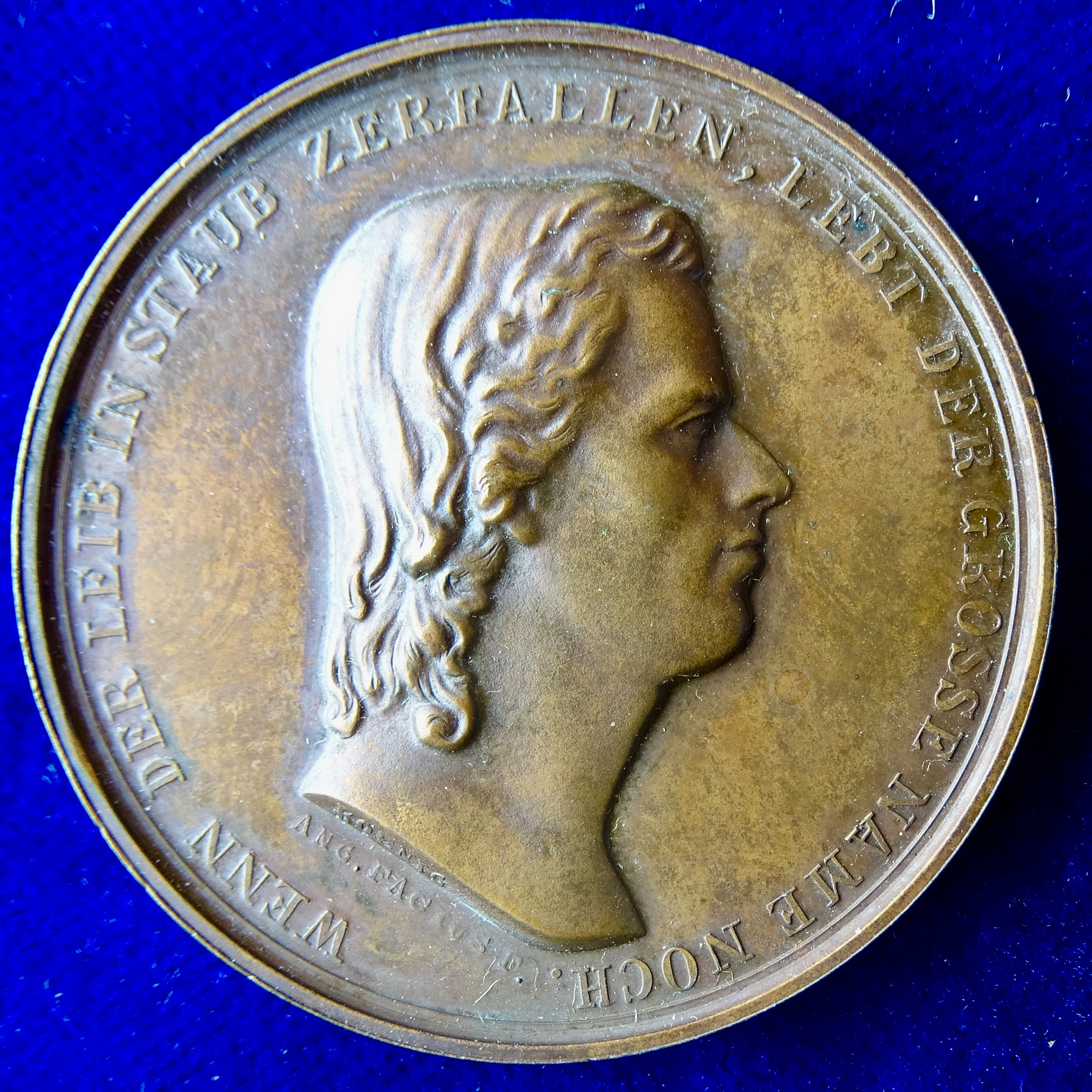
An original medal by Angelica Facius of the Schiller Haus, today a World Heritage Site, obverse

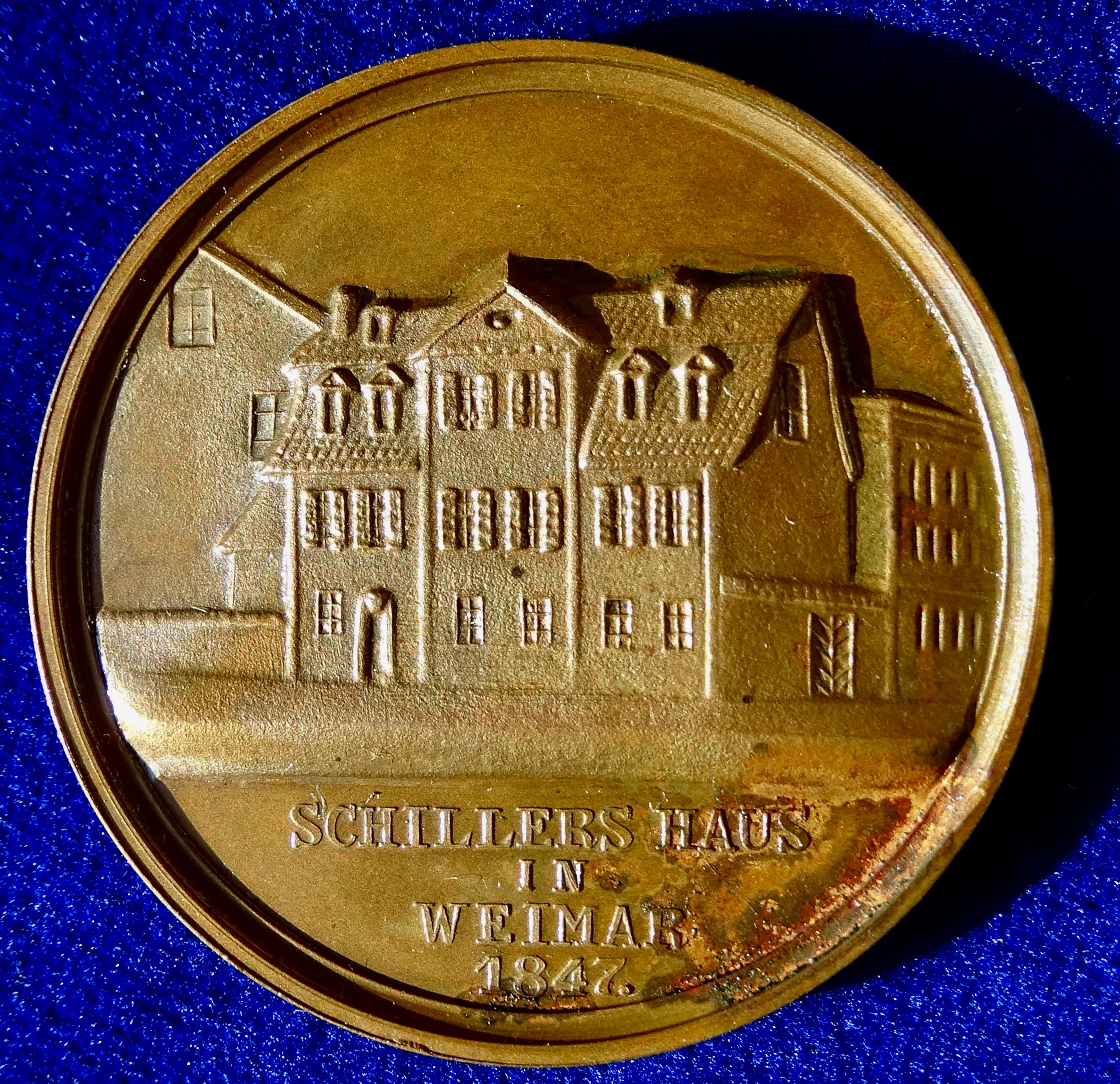
The reverse of this medal commemorating the purchase of Schiller's residence by the city of Weimar in 1847

== Life and work ==
She was born to Friedrich Wilhelm Facius, who was also an engraver and medalist. She was influenced by the intellectual circles around Goethe and initially studied art with Christian Daniel Rauch in Berlin. After five years of study with her father, while attending the Weimar Princely Free Drawing School, she received further instruction from Peter Kaufmann, the Court Sculptor. Her unusual talents brought her the support of many in the artistic community, including the famous medalist, Gottfried Bernhard Loos, as well as Goethe himself.

From 1827 to 1834, she returned to Berlin to serve an apprenticeship under Rauch. While there, she lodged with the family of Goethe's friend, the composer, Carl Friedrich Zelter, who kept Goethe informed of her progress.

He most notable works were made for the Schloss Weimar, including medallions, reliefs, and decorative doors. She also created nineteen filigreed cameos of notable Weimar personalities, which are now preserved in Dresden at the Green Vault. Also of note is a portrait medal of Grand Duke Karl August, carved in carnelian.

Many of her works were considered to be lost, but several cameos and candelabra figures have been discovered over the last century, as well as a bust of Zelter's daughter and a small statue of Anna Pavlovna.

She is interred at the Historical Cemetery, Weimar.

== Bibliography ==
- Claude Keisch, Roland März: Deutsche bildende Künstlerinnen von der Goethezeit bis zur Gegenwart. National-Galerie, Berlin 1975.
- Peter Bloch, et al., Ethos und Pathos, die Berliner Bildhauerschule 1786–1914., Verein für Kunstwiss., Berlin 1990 ISBN 978-3-7861-1598-4
- Eva Wipplinger: Medaillenkünstlerinnen in Deutschland. Kreativität in Geschichte und Gegenwart. Halle 1992 ISBN 978-3-86105-066-7
- Ulrike Müller (Ed.): Frauenpersönlichkeiten der Weimarer Klassik: der Umgang hier scheint mir sehr angenehm und gar nicht kostspielig. Weimar 1998, 2003 ISBN 978-3-89739-335-6
- Bärbel Kovalevski (Ed.): Zwischen Ideal und Wirklichkeit. Künstlerinnen der Goethe-Zeit zwischen 1750 und 1850. Ostfildern-Ruit 1999 ISBN 978-3-7757-0806-7
- Maja Brodrecht: Die Medaille in Goethes Gartensee. Auf der Suche nach der Weimarer Künstlerin A. Facius. Norderstedt 2020, ISBN 978-3-7504-7196-2
