= Candelabra =

Candle holder with multiple arms

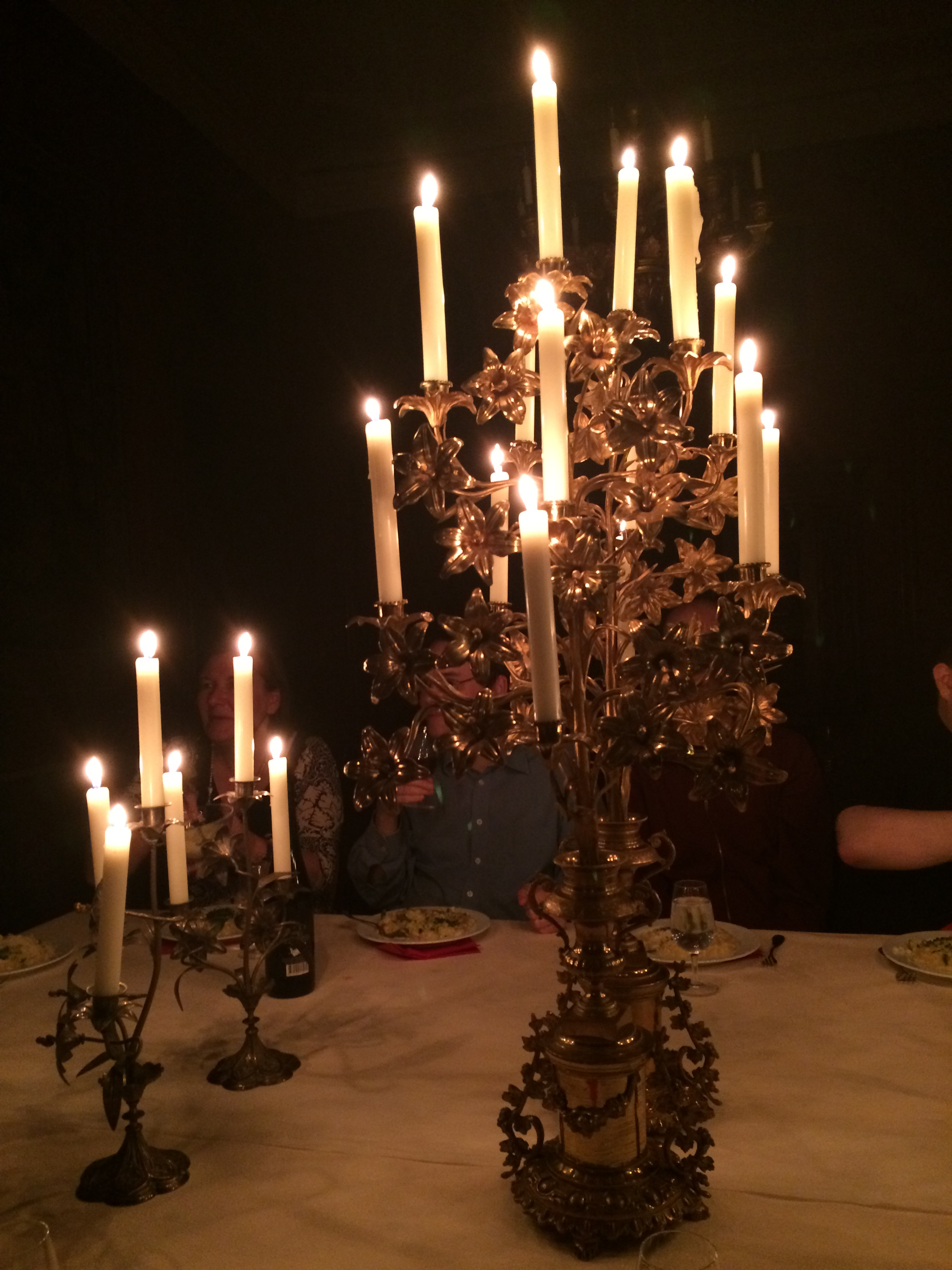
Candelabra with lit candles

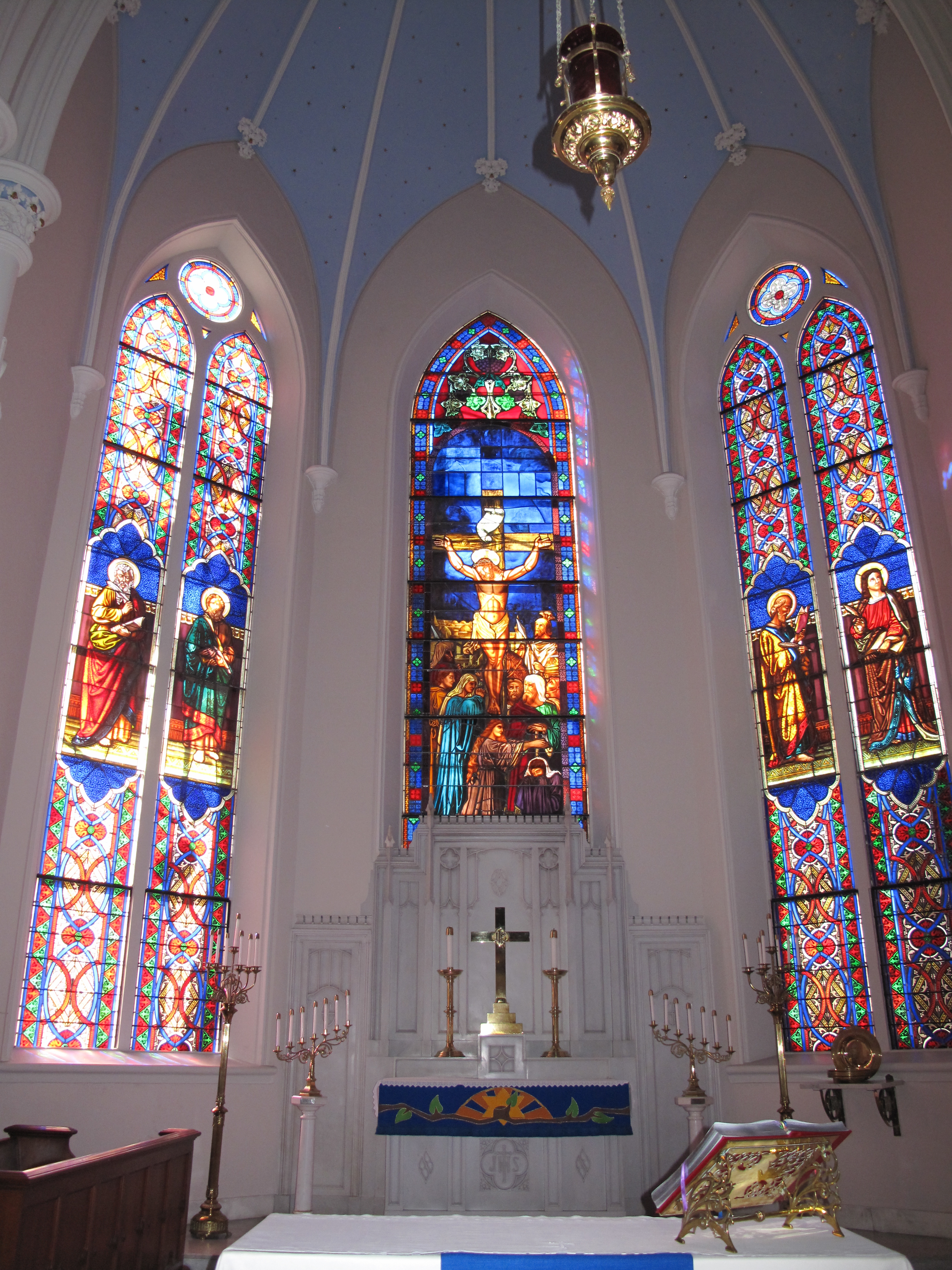
Candelabra located next to the high altar of St. Matthew's Evangelical Lutheran Church in Charleston, South Carolina

A candelabrum (pl. candelabra or candelabrums), or candelabra (pl. candelabras), is a type of candlestick which has multiple branches to hold several candles as opposed to only one. "Candelabra" can be used to describe a variety of candle holders including chandeliers. However, candelabra can also be distinguished as freestanding branched candle holders that are placed on a surface such as the floor, a stand, or a tabletop. Chandeliers, on the other hand, are hung from the ceiling.

The Romans used the term to describe a form of ornamental lighting, which may be a tall stand that supports a lamp. In Judaism, the menorah and hanukkiah are special kinds of candelabra. Candelabra are also used in Christian churches; they may be on or near the high altar in a number of churches, and used in certain Western Christian ceremonies such as the dikirion and trikirion used in certain Eastern Catholic, Eastern Lutheran and Eastern Orthodox Church liturgies. Candelabra in the form of branched candlesticks also came into use in homes as decorative lighting.

In modern times, electricity has largely relegated candleholders to decorative use in homes. Interior designers nowadays continue to model light fixtures and lighting accessories after candelabra and single candlesticks. Candelabra may be placed on the dinner table, especially on formal occasions. Although candelabra are designed to hold candles, modern candelabra may also use artificial candles with LED light bulbs.

== Etymology ==
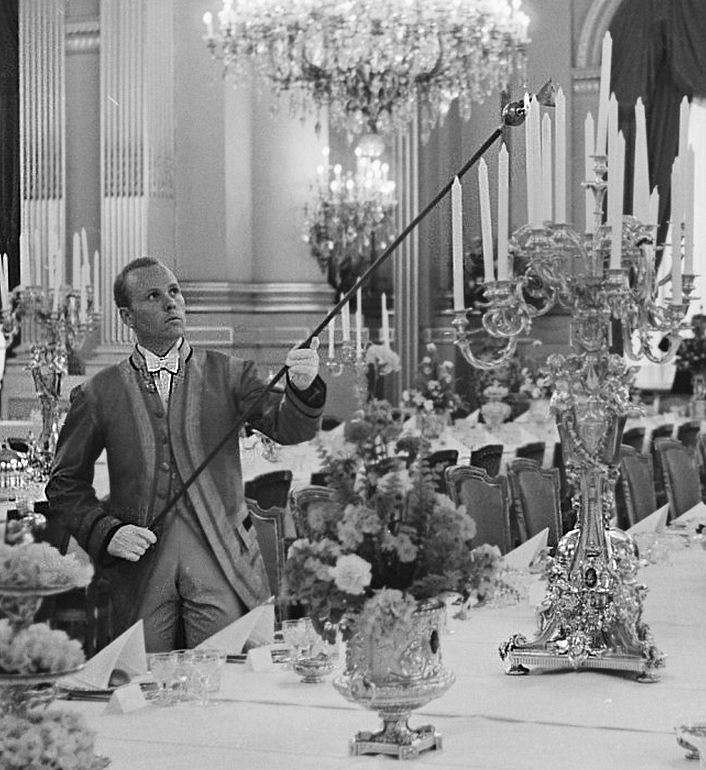
Candelabra used for state occasions at the Belgian court (1960)

The first known use of candelabra in English was in 1776, and candelabrum in 1811. The word is originally Latin, where candēlābrum (candela, candle, -b(a) rum, holder) means "candlestick”, ultimately deriving from candēla, meaning "candle". Candēlābrum is the singular form and candēlābra is the plural. Yet changes in English usage over time have brought candelabra into popular use as the singular form, with candelabras the supposed plural. "Candelabrums" may replace the Latin plural form.

A candelabrum is a form of candlestick, an object that holds a candle, and a candelabrum is a branched candlestick that supports multiple candles. The term is sometimes extended to chandeliers, but the two differ in that a candelabrum is placed on a surface, while a chandelier is hung from the ceiling.

== History ==
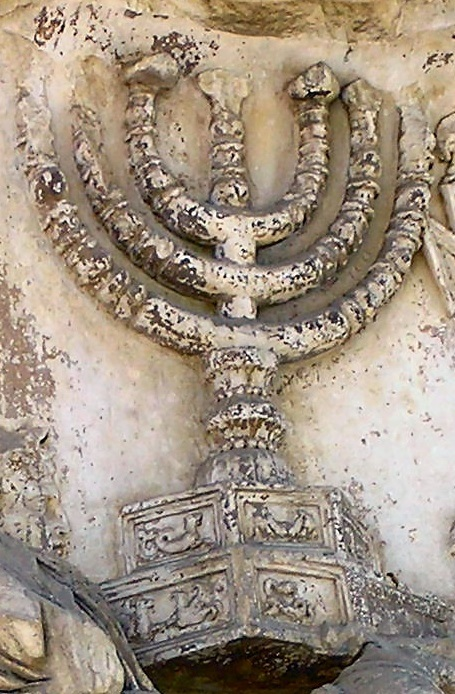
Menorah depicted in the Arch of Titus in Rome

Candelabra were known to have been used in the ancient world. A notable example is the seven-armed candelabrum or menorah, mentioned in the Hebrew Bible with instruction on its creation to Moses. The menorah is depicted in the Arch of Titus following the capture of Jerusalem. It has since become a symbol of Judaism and an Emblem of Israel, as well as a model of seven-armed candelabra used in medieval Christian churches. A bronze candelabrum was made by Callimachus for the Erechtheion in Athens, to carry the lamp sacred to Athena. In this case it is possible the lamp was suspended.

While "candelabrum" is now often used to mean a branched candle holder, the term has been used to describe a variety of lighting objects. A candelabrum may describe a tall stand that supports a lamp. The Roman candelabra may consist of a stalk or reed, the upper part moulded with projecting feature to carry lights at the top, and a base resting on three lions' or griffins' feet. The origin of the term, which means a candlestick, suggests that Roman candelabra may have a disk with a spike on top to carry a wax or tallow candle (candela or funalia). Candelabra, however, can have a disk at the top to carry a lamp, and sometimes there may be a hollow cup, in which resinous woods were burnt.

Ancient candelabra

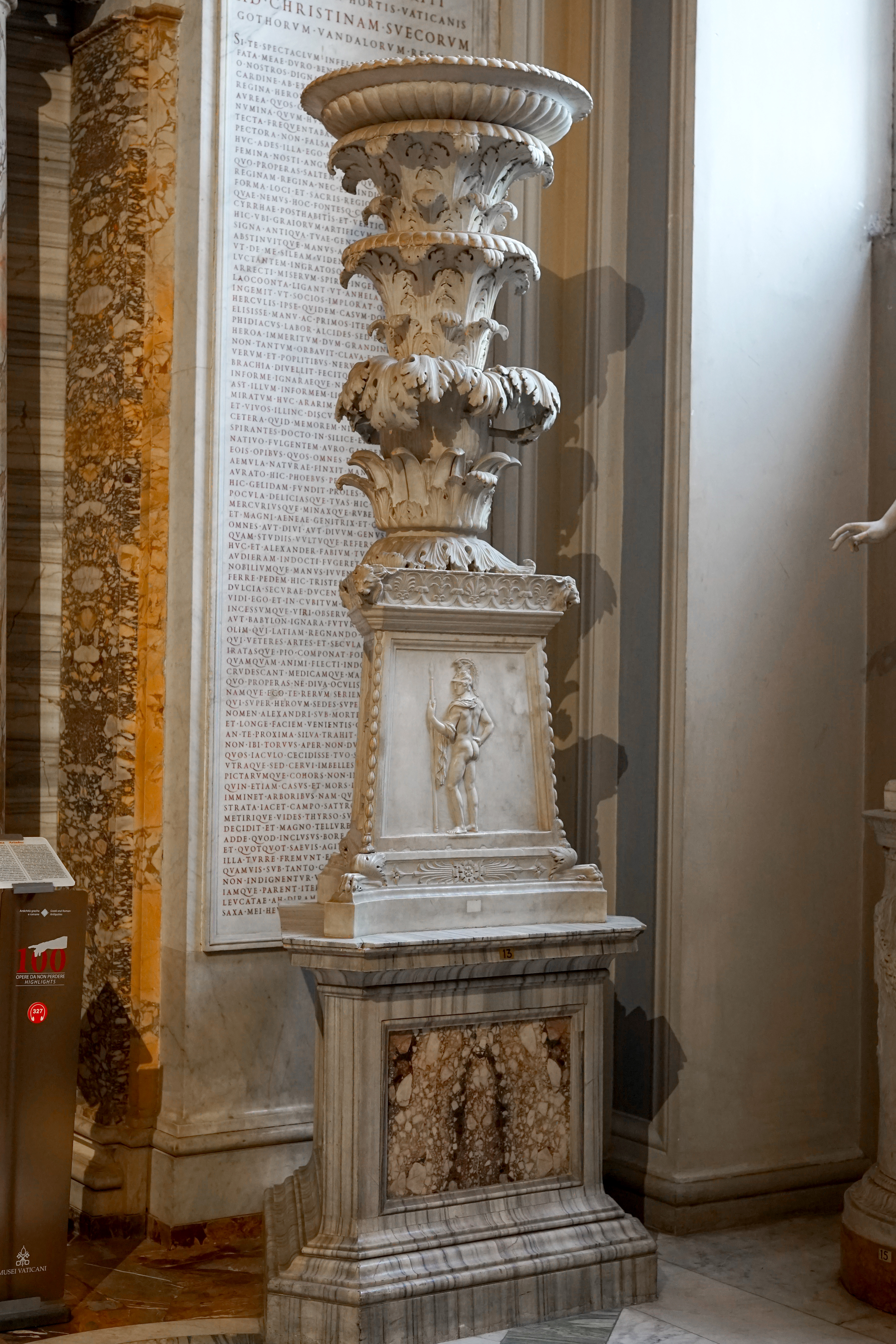
Barberini candelabrum in the Vatican Museums

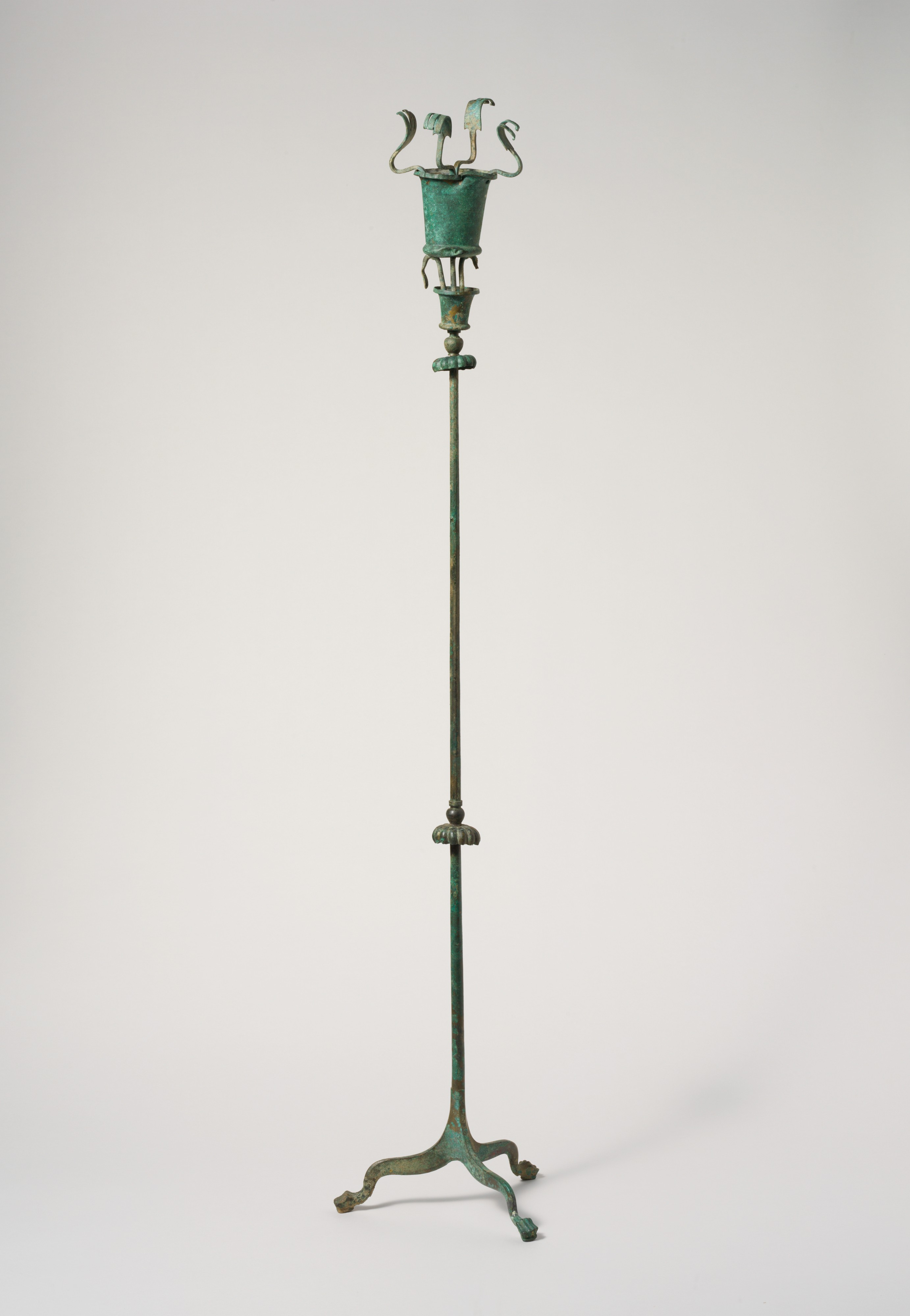
Etruscan candelabrum c. 550 B.C

The Roman candelabra used in public building can be of significant size, and they may have bulky supports in stone or marble, of which many examples were found in the thermae. These consists of a base, often triangular, a shaft either richly moulded or carved with the acanthus plant and crowned with a large cup or basin with similar design to the small sacrificial altars. Examples of the latter excavated from Hadrian's Villa are now found in the Vatican Museums. Simpler tall slender candelabra with three feet were used in a domestic setting in the Etruscan and Roman periods. These may be made of wood, but many made of bronze were excavated in Herculaneum and Pompeii. Other types of candelabra also existed in the Roman period; these may consist of a figure supporting one or two branches with plates for lamps, or a type that may be placed on a table, with a pillar that has branches from which lights are suspended.

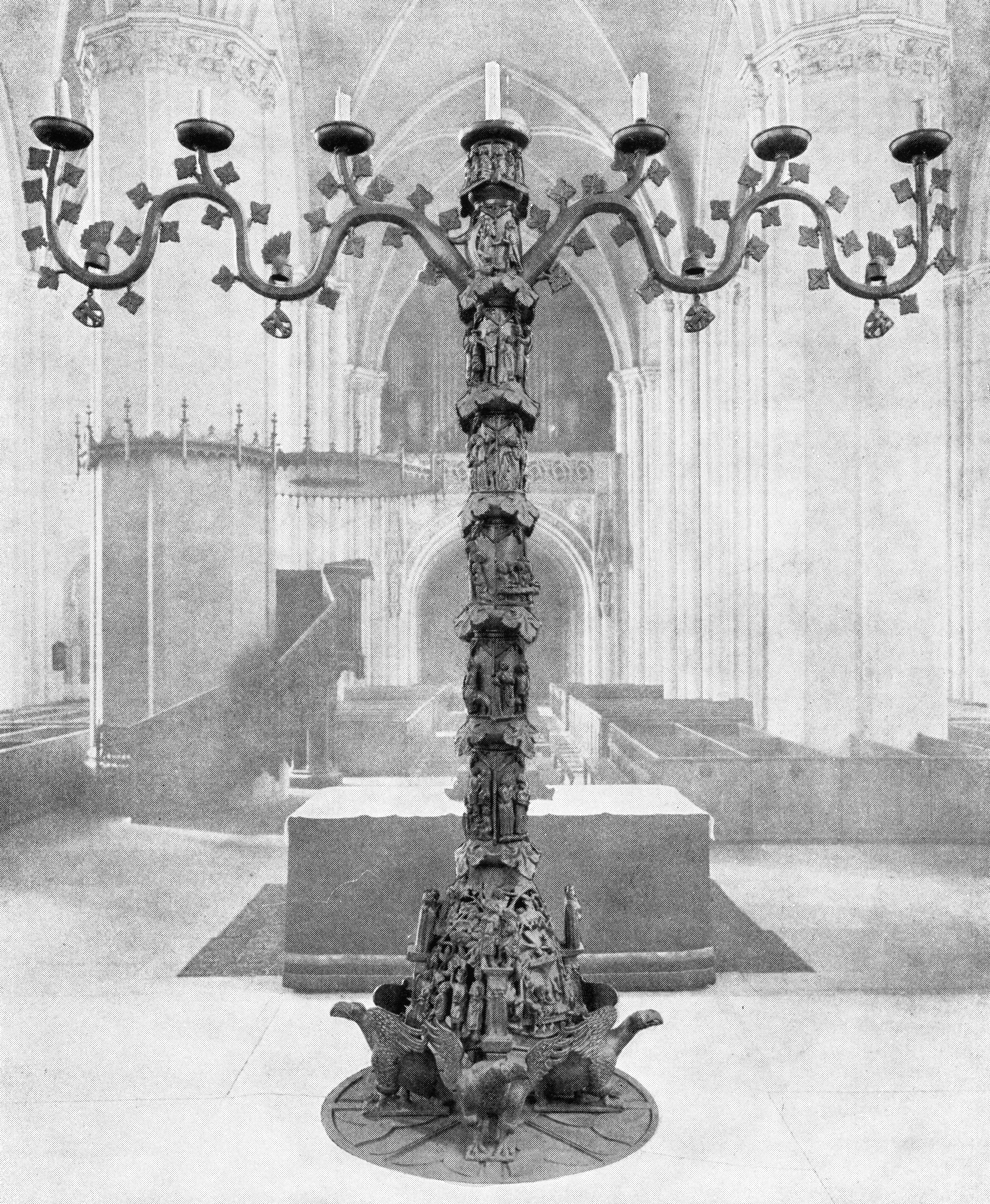
Gothic candelabra in Frankfurt, Germany

The Roman examples seem to have served as models for many of the candelabra in the churches in Italy. In the 4th century, Pope Sylvester I presented to churches brass candelabra inlaid with silver. Liturgical services were performed with the use of candlelight, and candelabra with prickets may be used to hold the candles in churches. The candelabra may be very large candlesticks supporting a single light, or they may have multiple branches supporting multiple candles. Seven-armed candelabra mentioned in the Bible also inspired their use in churches; they were known in the 8th century, with the Essen candelabrum from around 1,000 AD the earliest surviving example. They are also used in the Eastern Orthodox Church. Candelabra may be used in some religious ceremonies.

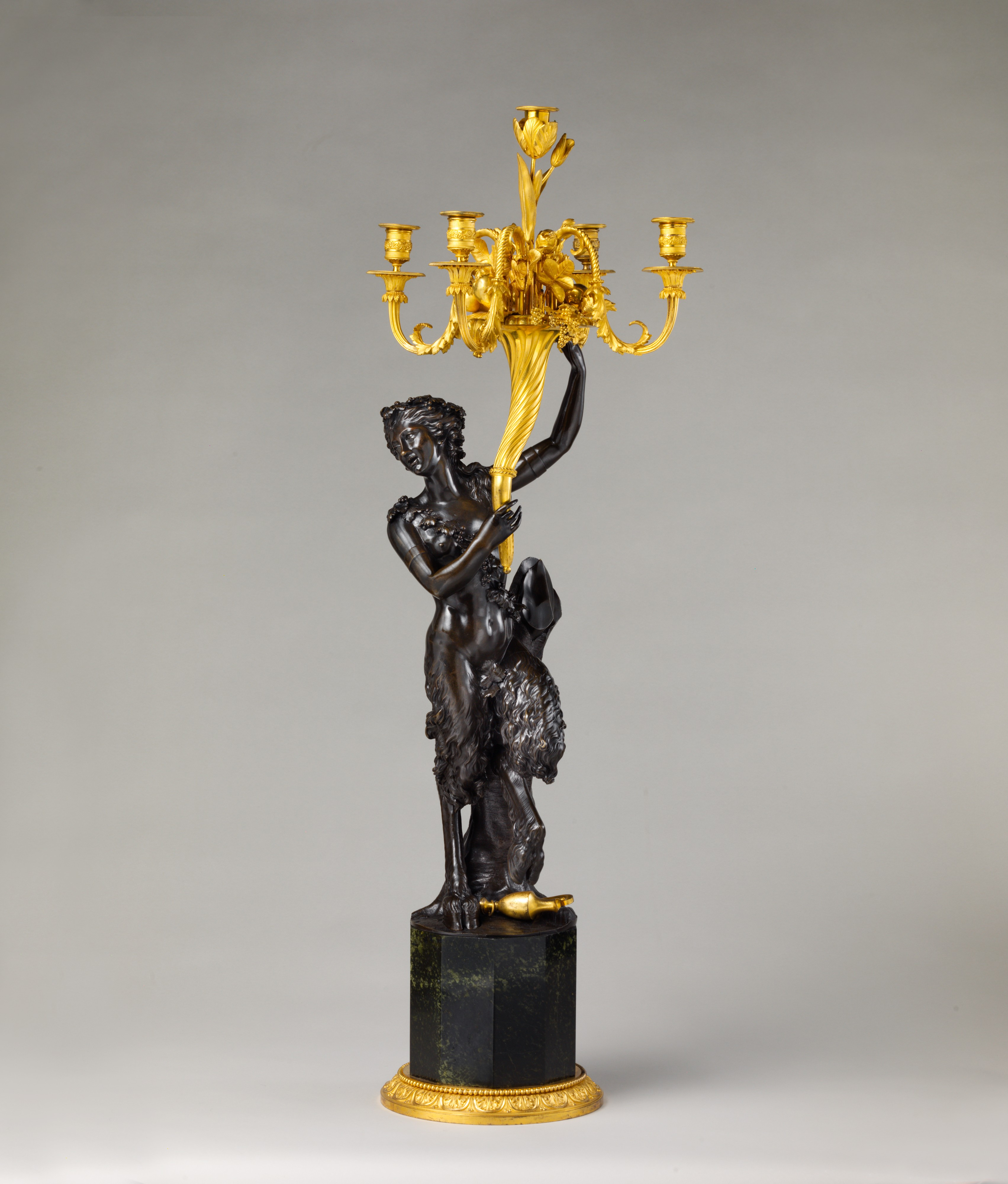
A five-light candelabrum c. 1785

Candelabra in the form of branched candle holders were commonly found in religious buildings, but they were also used in the homes of the wealthy. Good wax candles were expensive in the early period and only the wealthy could afford them, while the cheaper tallow candles made of animal fat were smelly, smokey and burned quickly. Candle holders were therefore rare in ordinary households in the early period.

By the 17th century in France, candelabra was defined by César-Pierre Richelet as "a large room candlestick which has several branches", although candelabra existed in other forms. The candelabra may be placed on a fireplace mantel, table, guéridon, and torchère, or if large, on the floor. In England in the 18th century, candelabra may be used interchangeably with a number of terms, such as branches, chandeliers, lustres, girandoles, and wall-lights. Girandoles were a form of candelabra with crystals in the 17th century, but were sold as candelabra in England by the end of the 18th century.

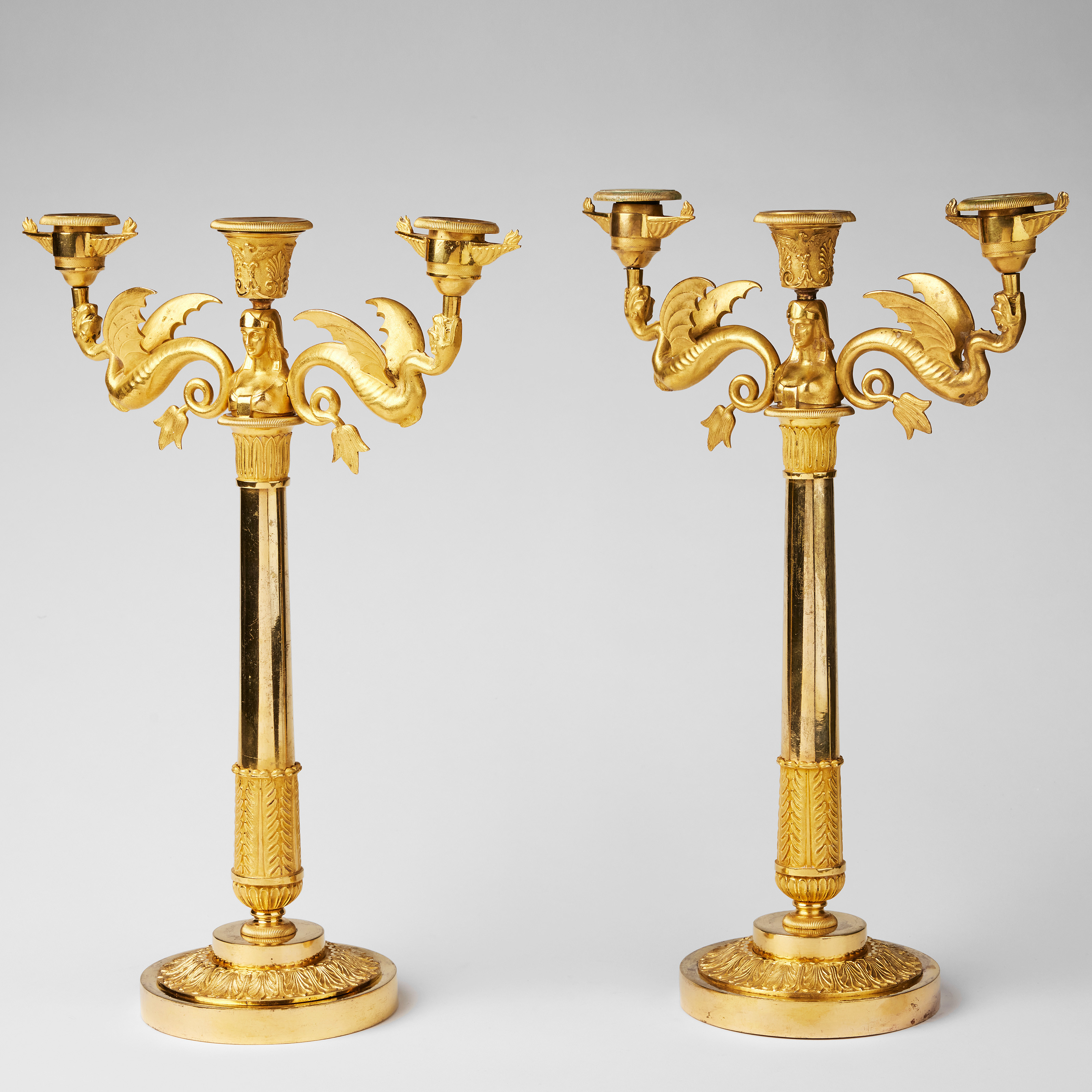
A pair of candelabra with three branches, the top part can be detached leaving a single-armed candlestick

In the 18th century, candelabra that are portable became more popular than sconces fixed onto the wall. Two-branched candelabra were then the most common, and many designs allowed the branches to be detached leaving a single-armed candlestick. By the 19th century, silver candelabra with multiple branches were often used together with elaborate centerpieces on dinner tables.

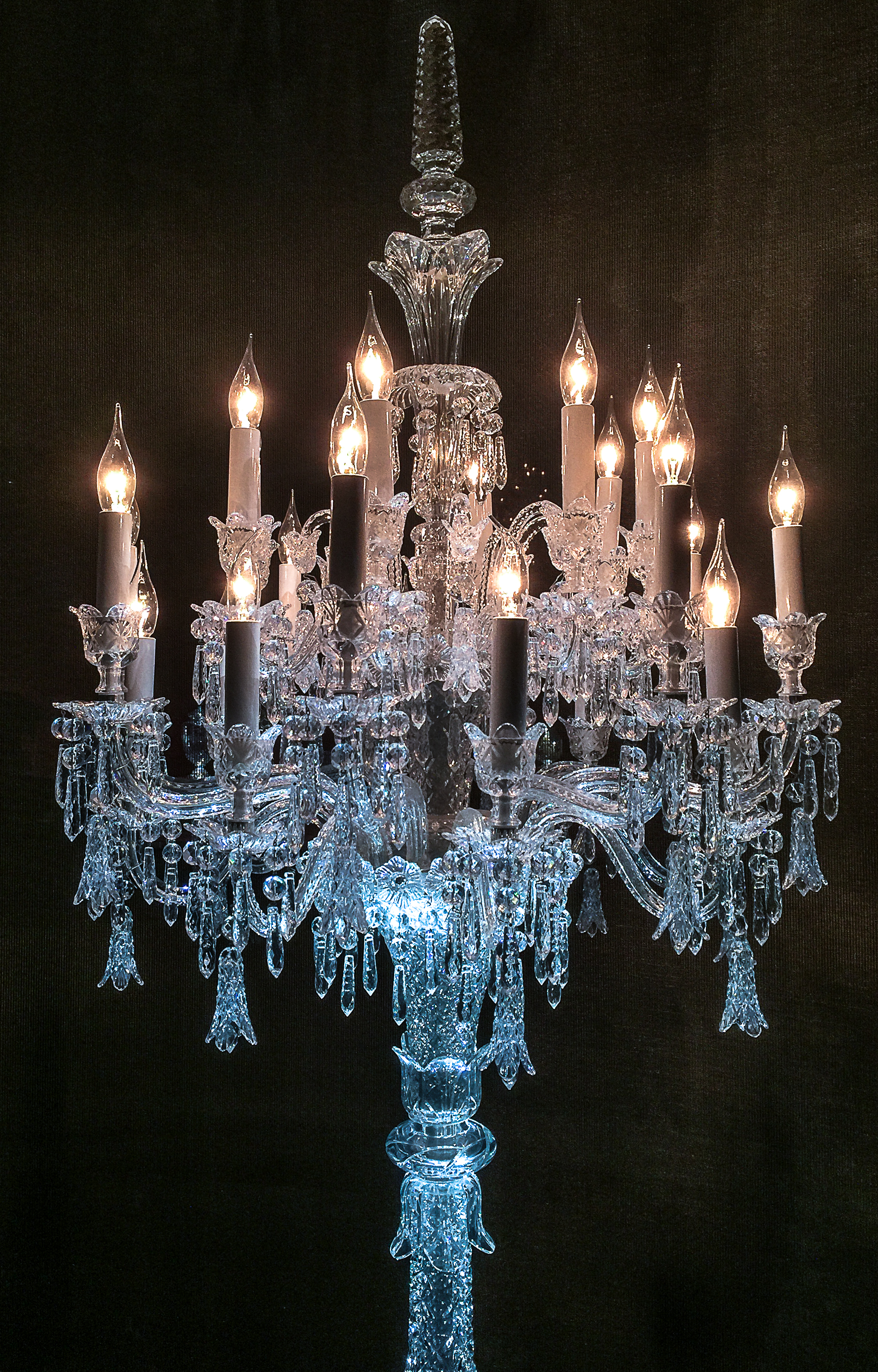
Baccarat glass candelabrum

By the 20th century, electric light became the common form of lighting, which rendered the use of candle light non-essential. Candelabra, however, continued to be used, especially on formal occasions. Nowadays candles are still commonly used, but they may also be substituted by artificial candles with LED or incandescent light bulbs. The term ‘candelabra’ is commonly used to describe small light bulbs used in chandeliers and other lighting fixtures made for decoration as well as lighting.

== Candelabra antennas ==
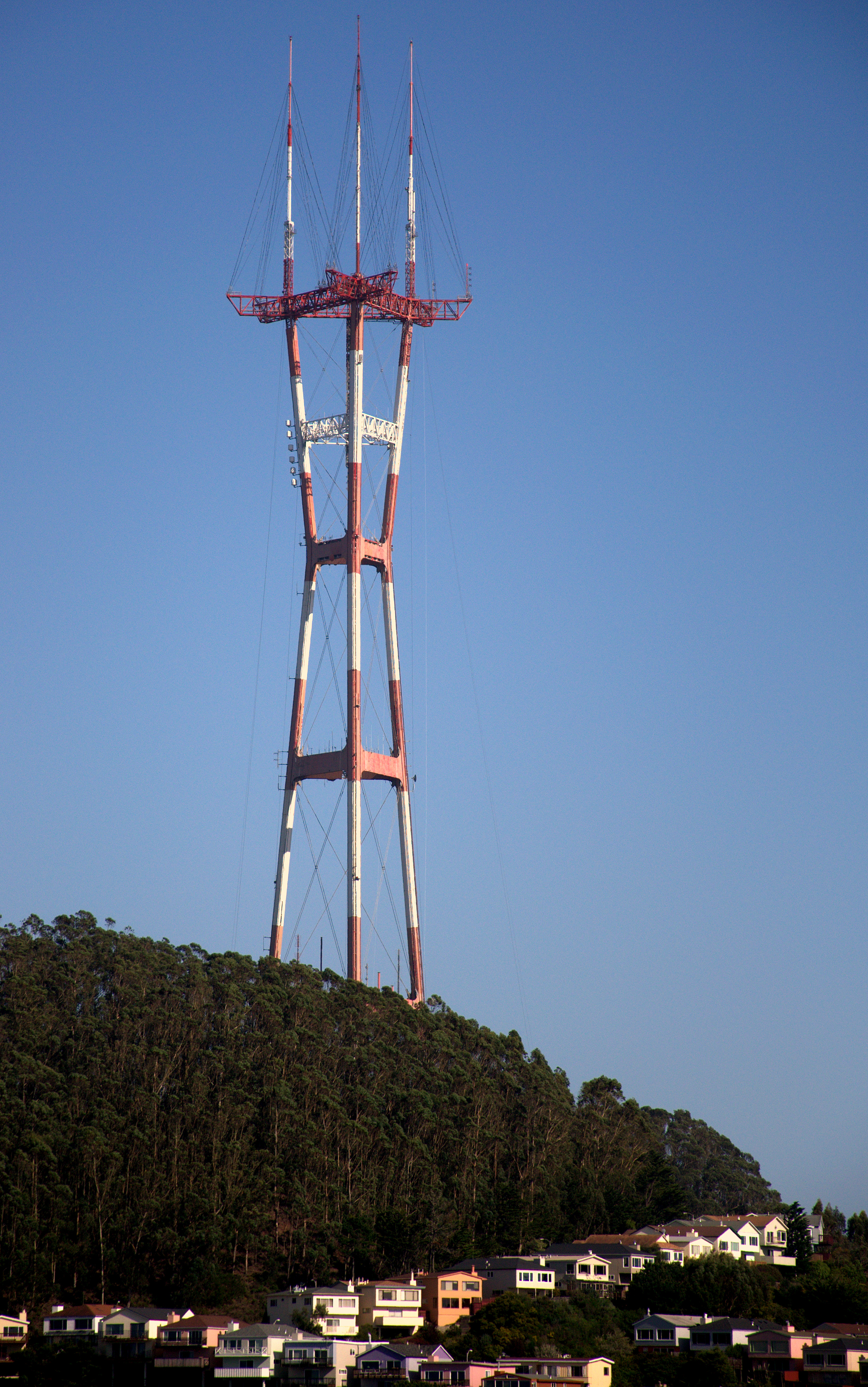
Sutro Tower from Grandview

In the United States and Canada, the word candelabra is used to refer to radio masts and towers with multiple transmission antennas. Sutro Tower in San Francisco and John Hancock Center in Chicago are examples of such structures. Baltimore's TV stations, WMAR-TV, WBAL-TV, and WJZ-TV in 1959 built the world’s first three-antenna candelabra tower, 730 feet tall. Other examples include the Mount Royal Candelabra in Montreal, the KXTV/KOVR/KCRA Tower, KSMO Candelabra Tower, KMBC/KCWE Candelabra Tower, and the Madison Community Candelabra Tower in Madison, Wisconsin.

== Gallery ==
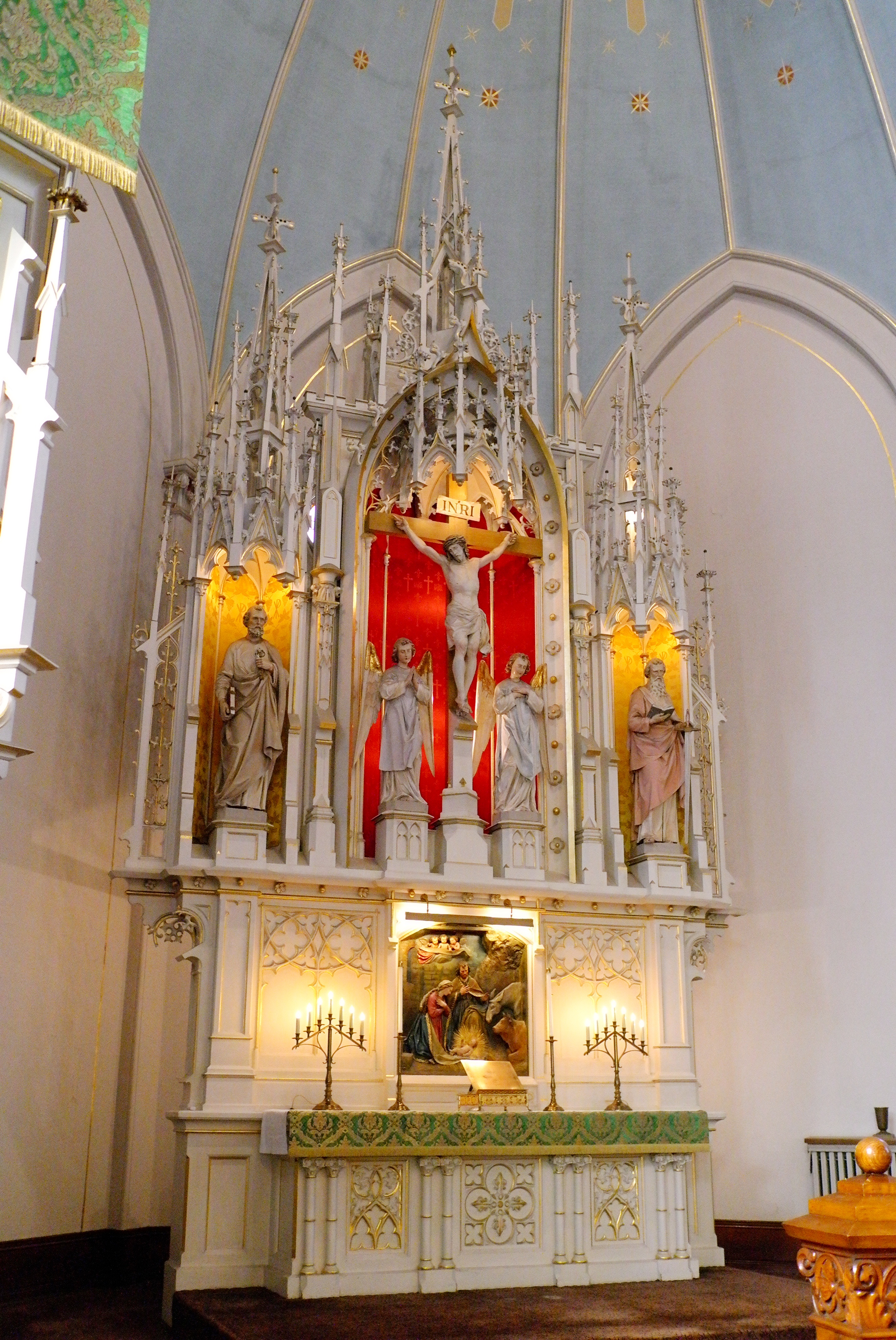
Candelabra atop the high altar of Saint John's Evangelical Lutheran Church in Milwaukee

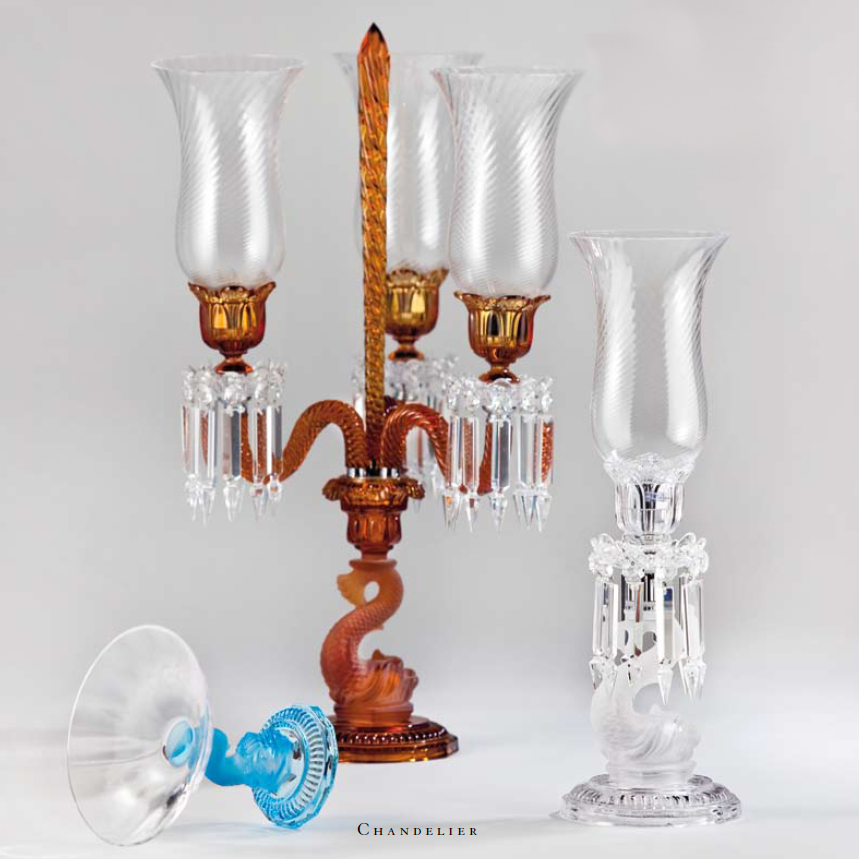
Crystal candelabrum from Portieux

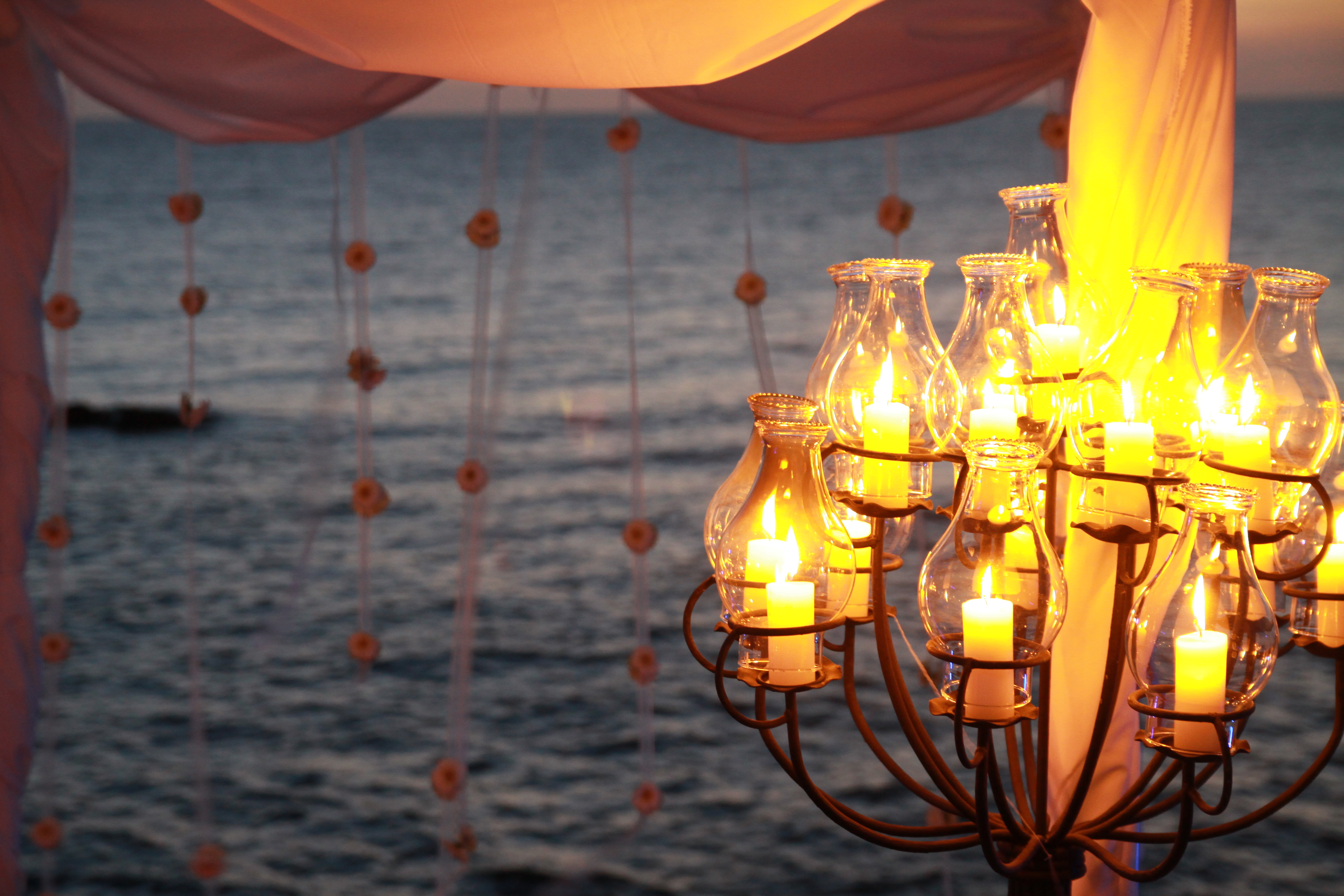
A modern candelabrum used decoratively at a wedding in the Casa Pueblo historic building in Uruguay

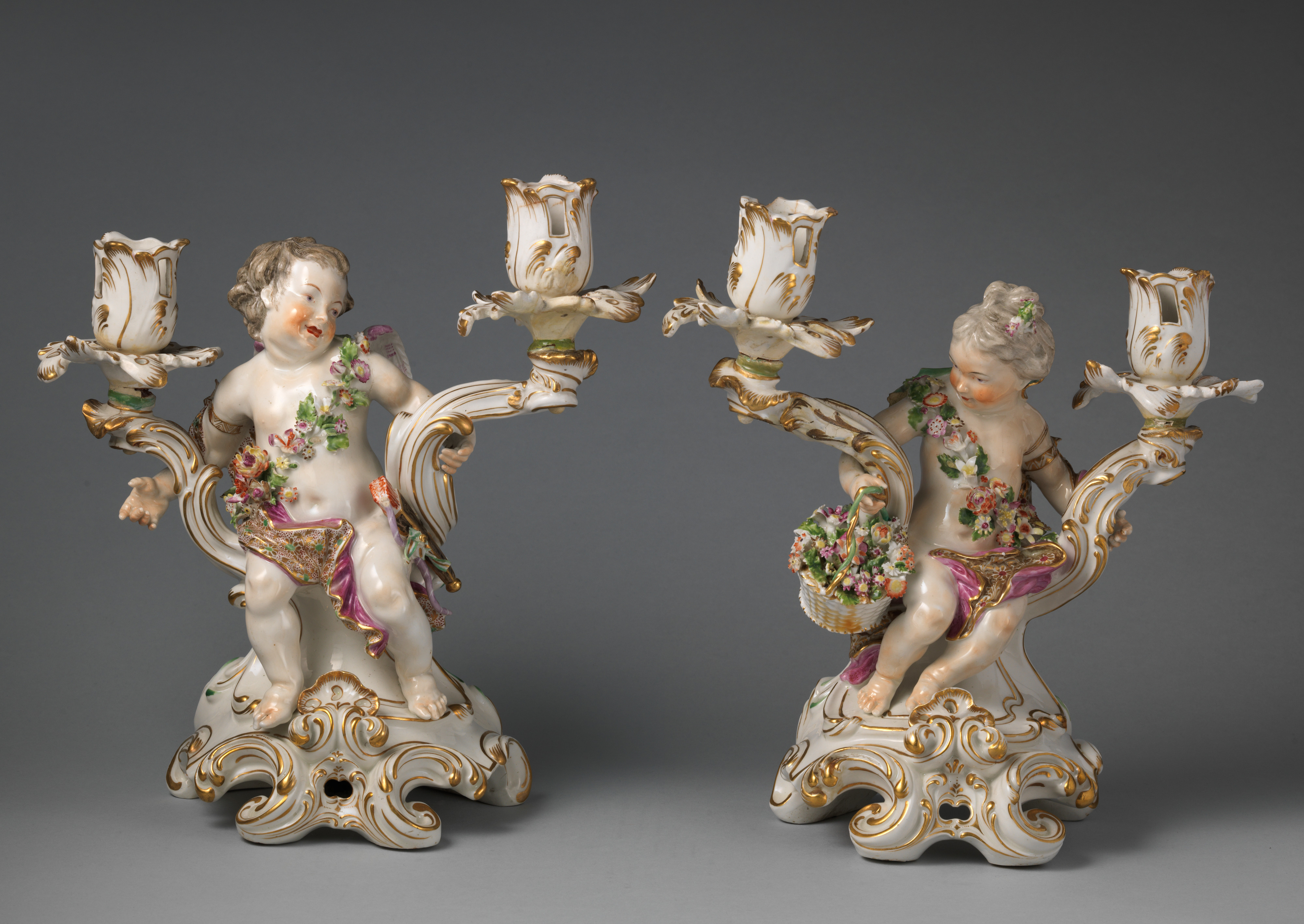
Porcelain candelabra

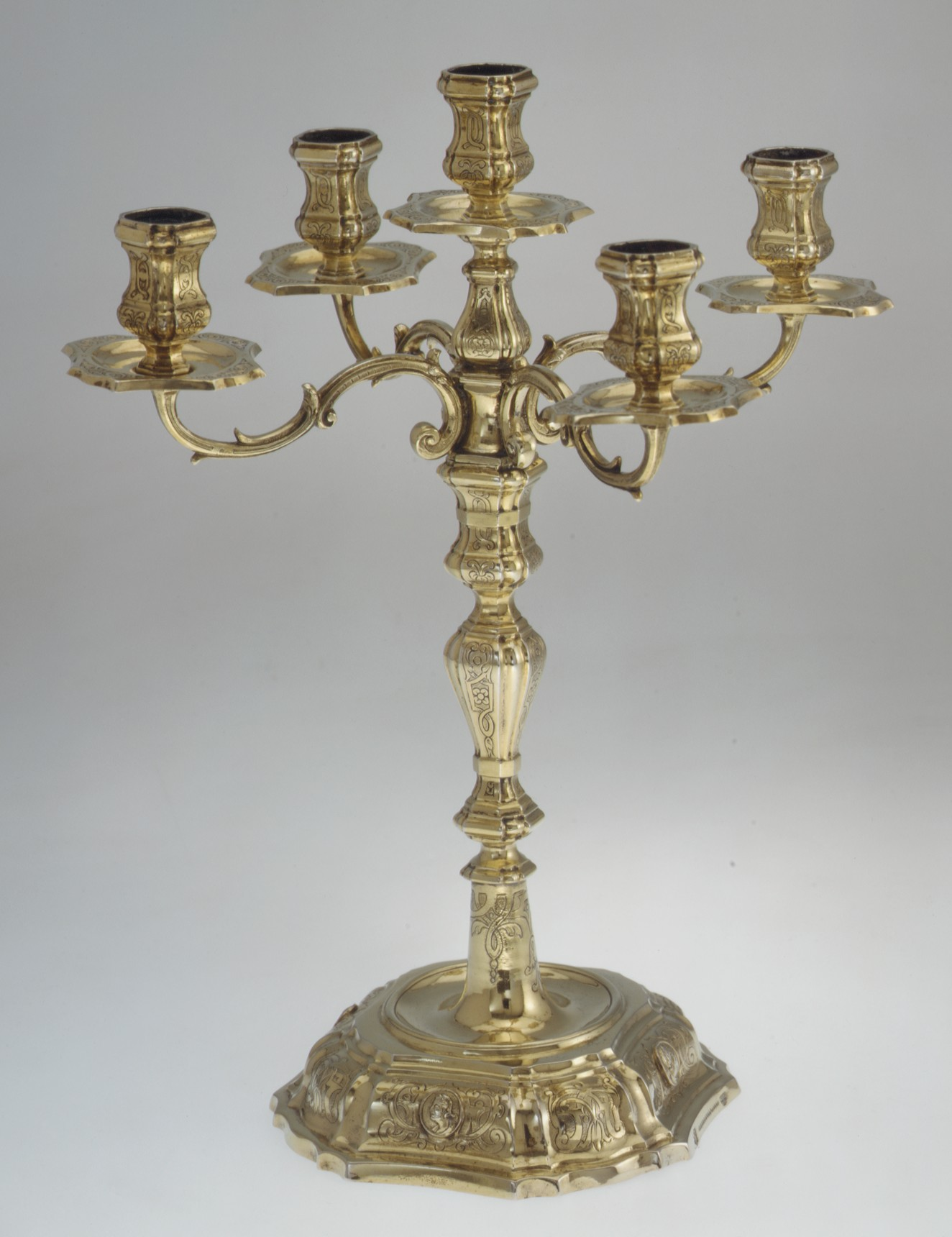
A five-armed candelabrum

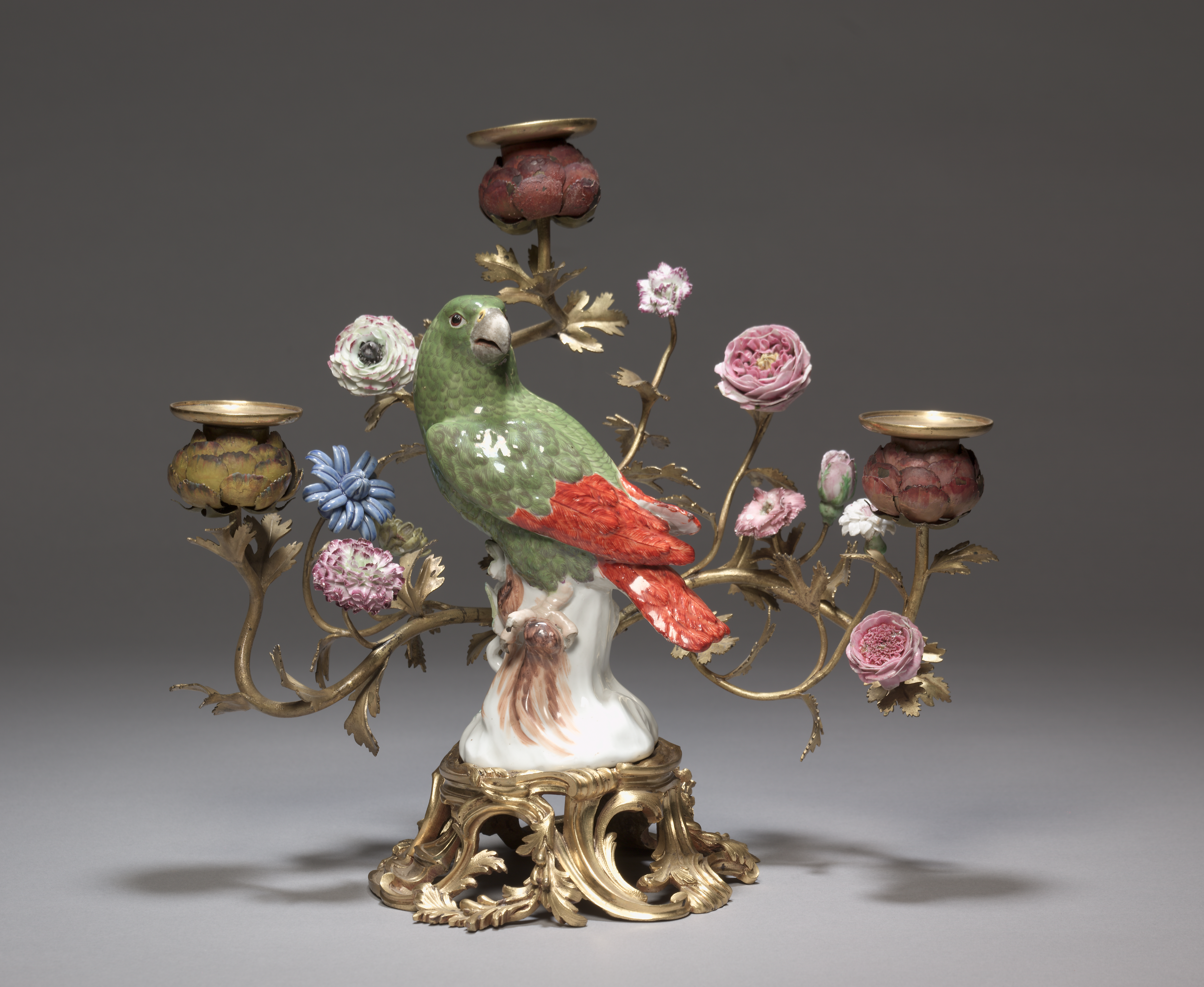
Candelabrum with Meissen porcelain parrot

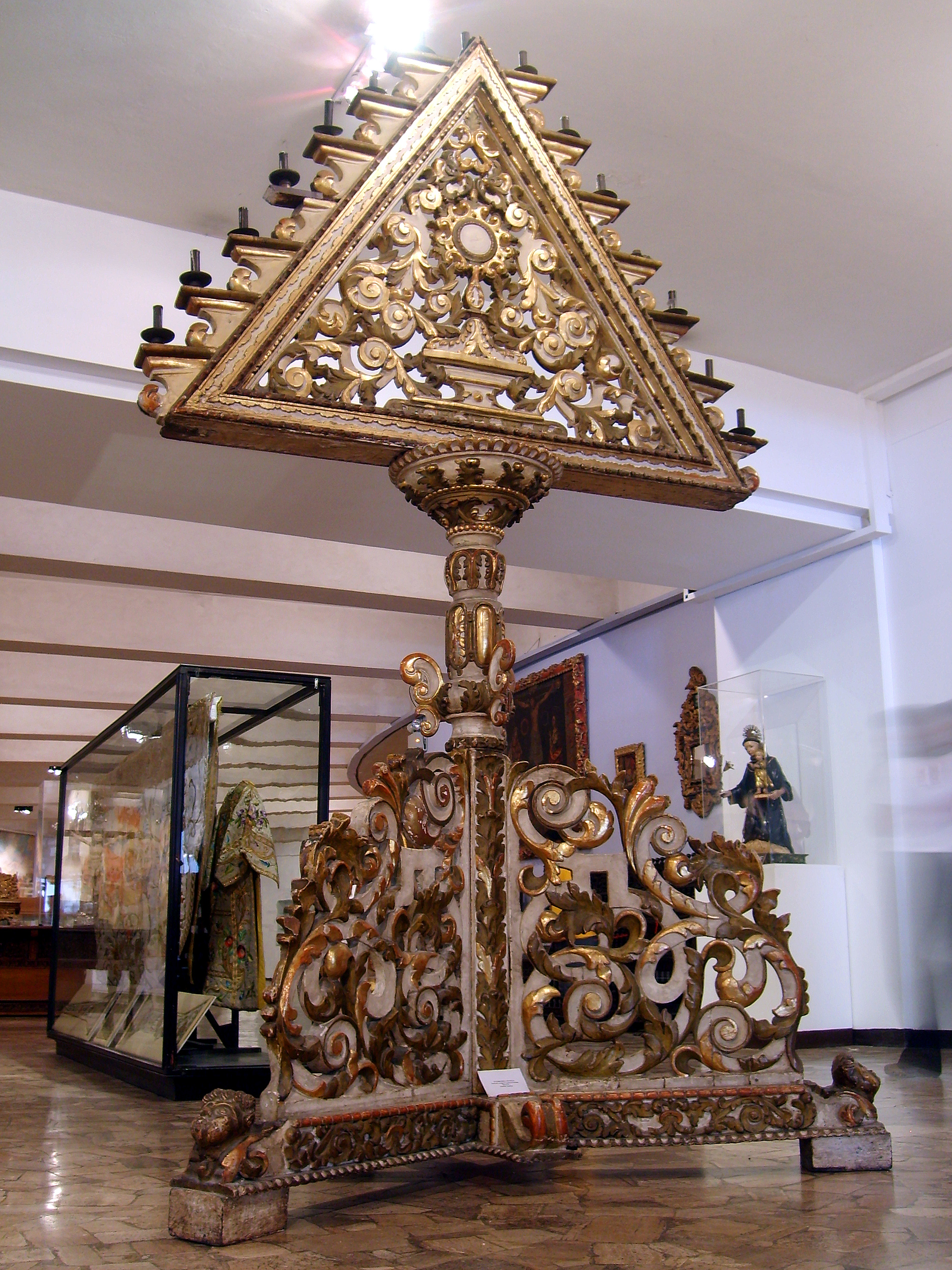
Tenebrae candelabrum

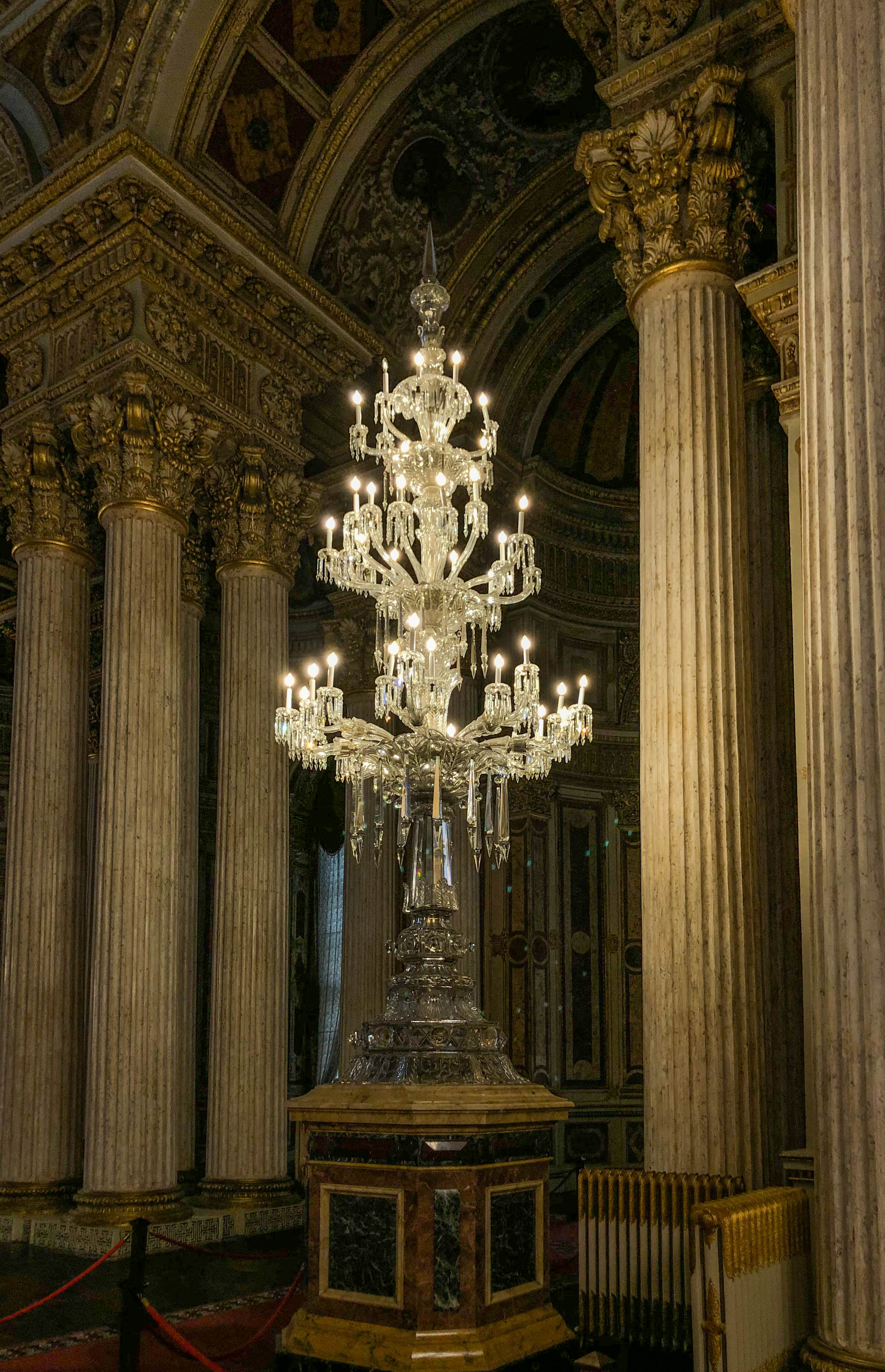
Glass candelabra in Turkey

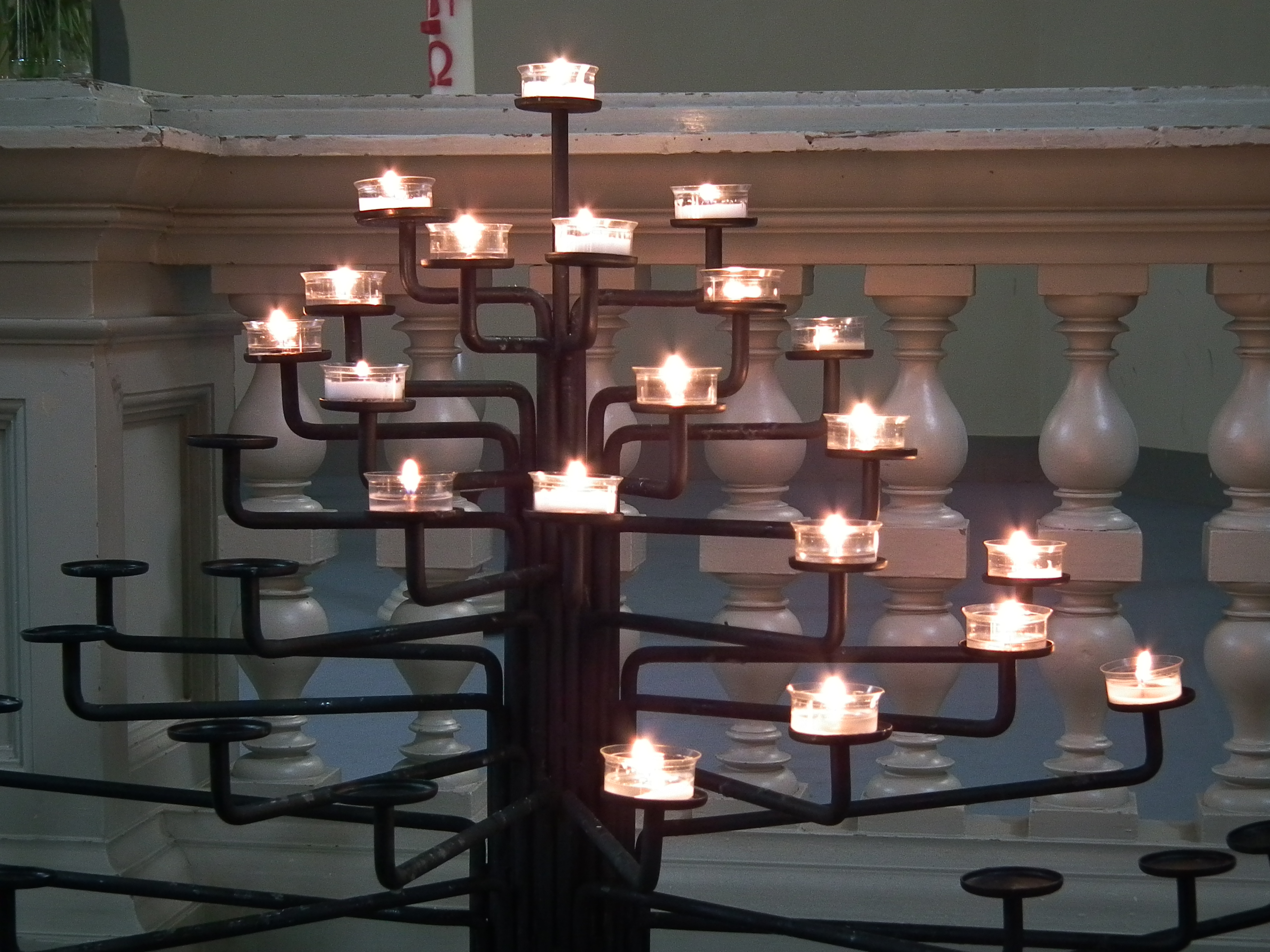
Votive candle rack that resembles a candelabra in a church in Germany

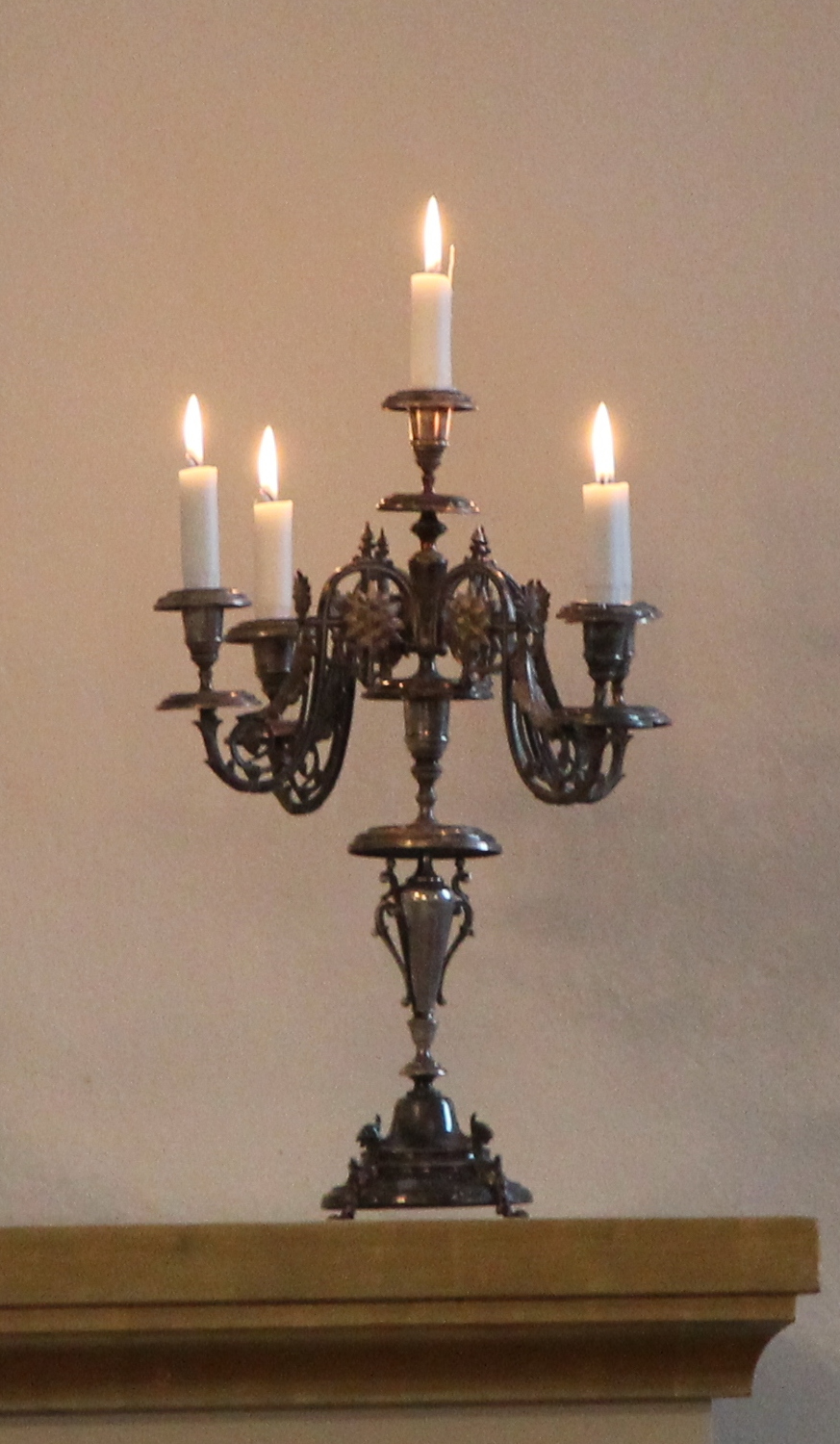
Candelabra in Finland

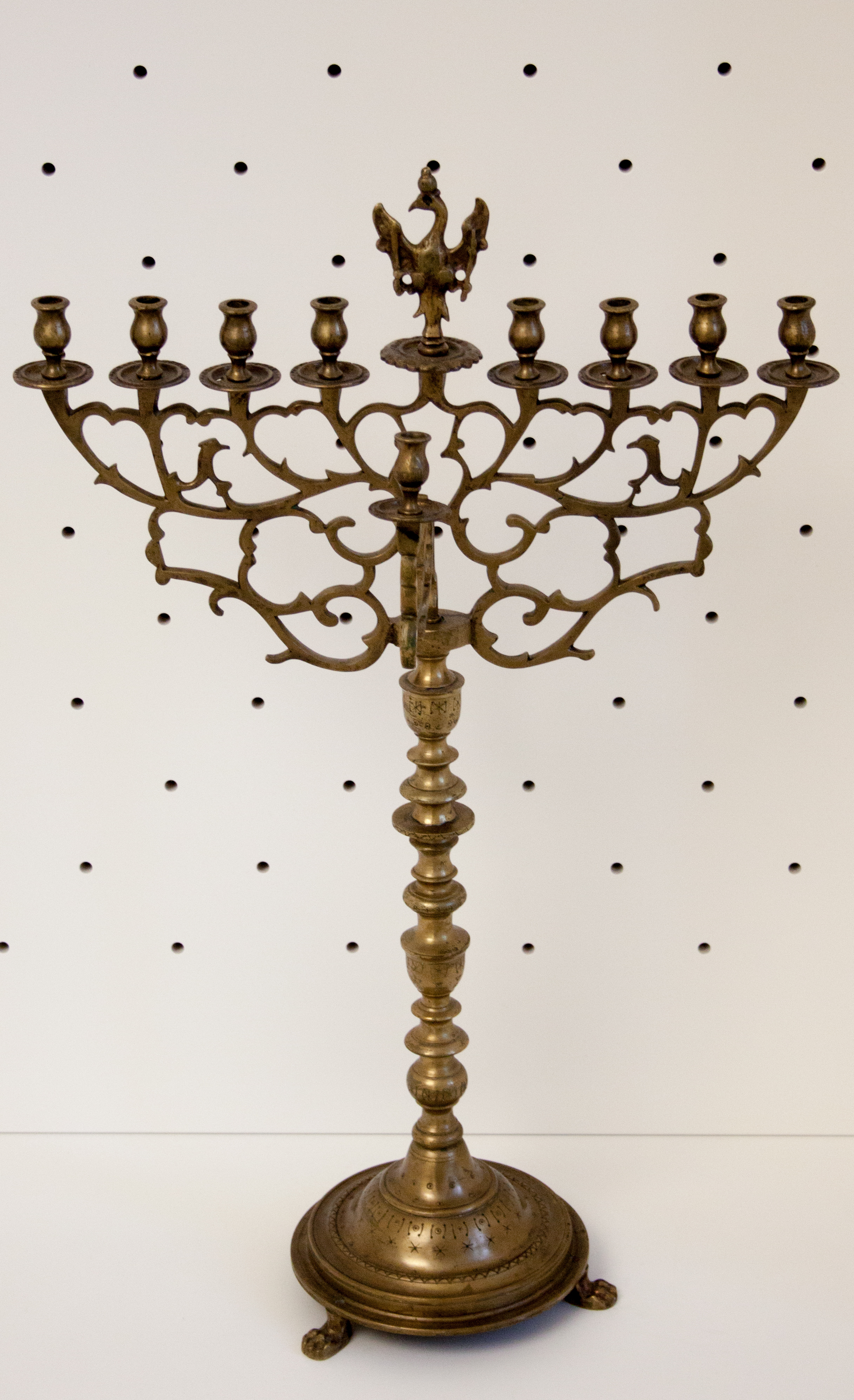
A hanukiah

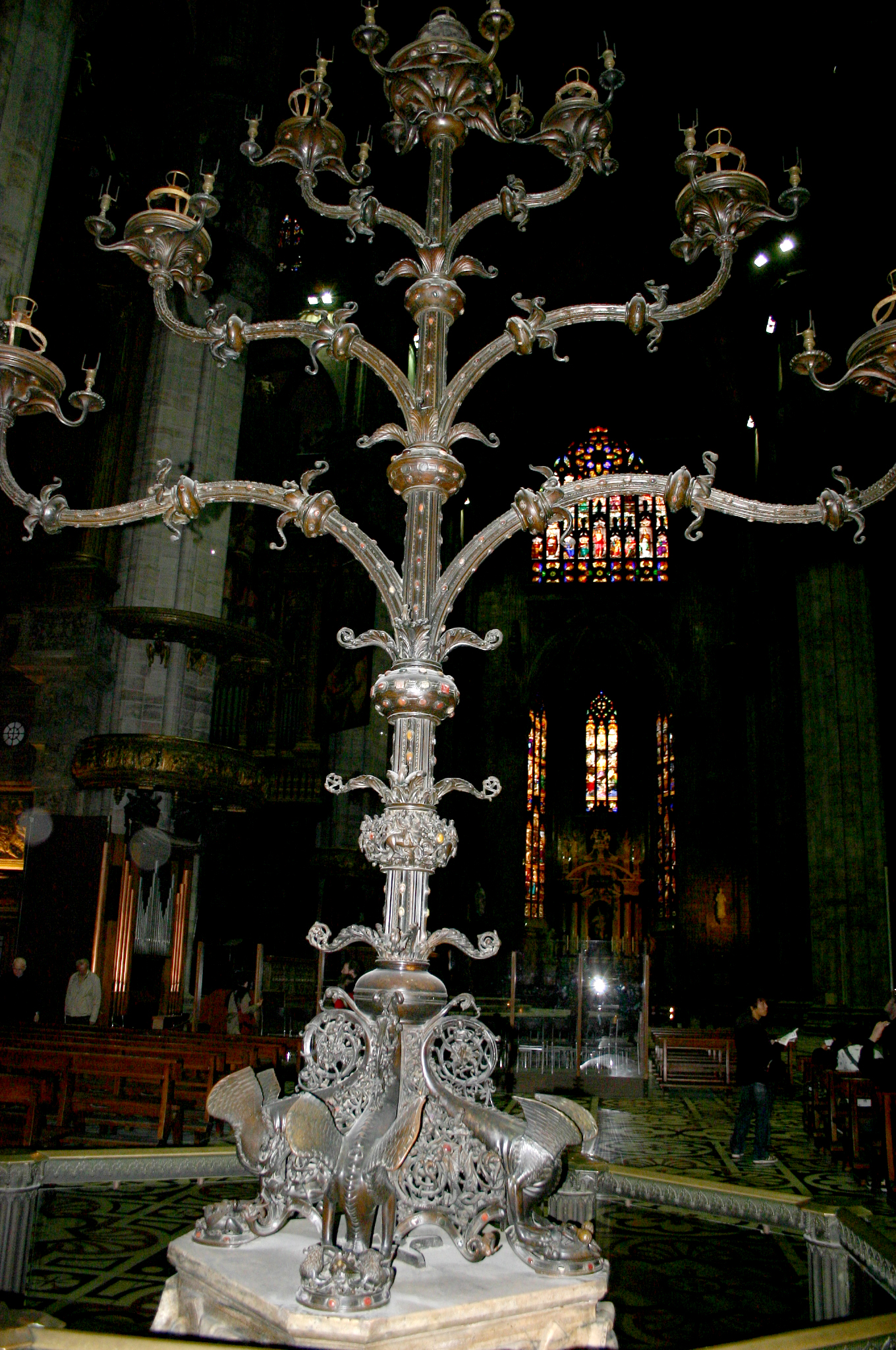
12th-century Trivulzio Candelabrum

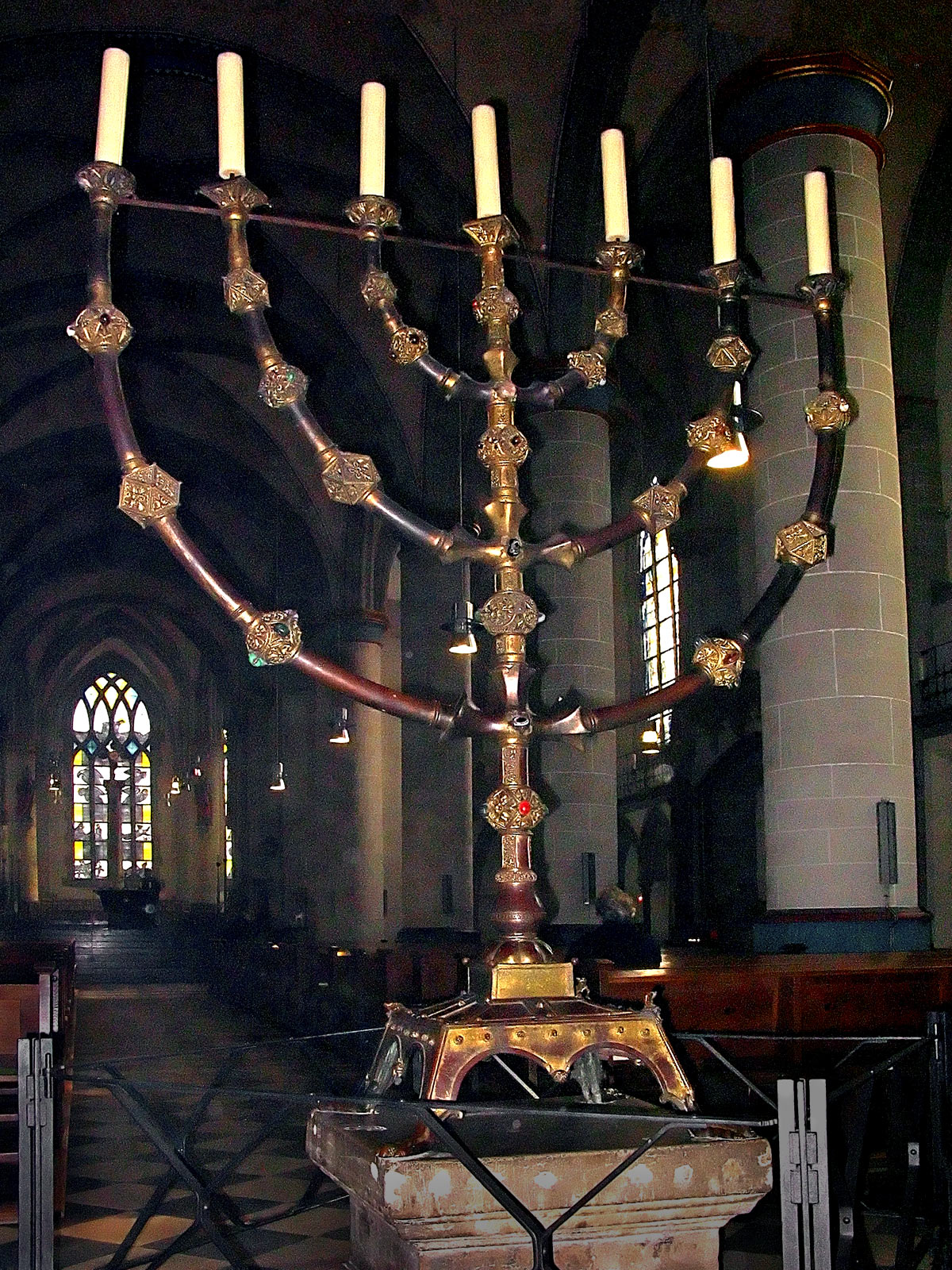
Essen candelabrum in Germany

== See also ==
- Candlestick
- Girandole
- Torchère
- Paracas Candelabra
- Charlottenburg Candelabra a pair of ornamental colonnades in west Berlin with a passing resemblance to candelabra
- Tenebrae
