= Friedrich Wilhelm Facius =

German gem cutter, engraver and medalist

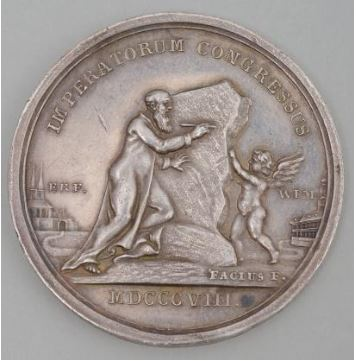
Commemorative medal for the Congress of Erfurt in 1808. Reverse: An allegorical representation of Time, inscribing the history of the meeting on a rock; dictated to him by a winged Genius.

Friedrich Wilhelm Facius (3 December 1764 in Greiz – 4 May 1843 in Weimar) was a German gem cutter, engraver and medalist.

== Life and work ==
His father was a merchant, who wanted him to take up a career in business, but he wanted to be an engraver. After acceding to his father's wishes and saving a small sum of money, he was finally given permission to pursue his own goals. Accordingly, in 1781, he left home for Dresden, to study engraving. He then returned to Greiz, where he practiced his new profession until 1788. At that time, he moved to Weimar, seeking greater opportunities. There, he became acquainted with Goethe, who encouraged him to learn stone cutting. Working with information provided by Goethe, he made his own tools and machines, but discovered that his skills were not quite up to the task. As a result, he went back to Dresden to take lessons from the stone cutter, Gottfried Benjamin Tettelbach (1750-1813).

He then set up a stone cutting and engraving workshop in Weimar, where he produced numerous busts in stone and steel. He also became known as a medalist. His notable works in that medium include one commemorating the meeting between Napoleon and Tsar Alexander I in Erfurt in 1808; the 78th birthday of Christoph Martin Wieland in 1813; and the farewell ceremonies for Professor Paul Johann Anselm Ritter von Feuerbach, upon his departure from Jena to Ansbach in 1817.

He was also an inventor. During reconstruction of the Schloss Weimar, he devised a stucco compound that would become as hard as stone after a short time. In addition, he had secret methods for polishing steel and hardening metal stamps to keep them from cracking.

In 1829, he was appointed the official medalist of Weimar. In 1840, he was named an Honorary Professor.

Of his five children, only his daughter Angelica followed him into the trade. Today, her works are better known.

== Sources ==
- Carl August Hugo Burkhardt (1877). "Facius, Friedrich Wilhelm". Allgemeine Deutsche Biographie (in German). Vol. 6. Leipzig: Duncker & Humblot. pp. 530–531.
- Wolfgang Steguweit: Europäische Medaillenkunst von der Renaissance bis zur Gegenwart. Berlin 1995
- Georg Herz: Die Greizer Künstlerfamilie Facius. In: Jahrbuch des Museums Reichenfels-Hohenleuben Bd. 50. Hohenleuben 2005, S. 33–68
- Facius, Friedrich Wilhelm. In: Meyers Konversations-Lexikon 1885–1892, 5. Band, Seite 1011
