= Peter Iver Kaufman =

American philosopher

Peter Iver Kaufman is an American philosopher. He is the George Matthews and Virginia Brinkley Modlin Chair in Leadership Studies at the University of Richmond and is an emeritus professor of University of North Carolina at Chapel Hill.

== Works ==
- Kaufman, Peter Iver (2014) [1990]. Redeeming Politics. Princeton University Press. ISBN 978-1-4008-6110-1.
- Kaufman, Peter Iver (2018) [1996]. Church, Book, And Bishop: Conflict And Authority In Early Latin Christianity. Routledge. ISBN 978-0-429-98128-9.
- Kaufman, Peter Iver (2007). Incorrectly Political: Augustine and Thomas More. Eurospan Group. ISBN 978-0-268-03314-9.
- Kaufman, Peter Iver (2013). Religion Around Shakespeare. Vol. 1. Penn State Press. doi:10.5325/j.ctt32b9pj. ISBN 978-0-271-06340-9. JSTOR 10.5325/j.ctt32b9pj.
- Kaufman, Peter Iver (2017). Augustine's Leaders. Wipf and Stock Publishers. ISBN 978-1-5326-1565-8.
- Kaufman, Peter Iver (2019). On Agamben, Arendt, Christianity, and the Dark Arts of Civilization. Bloomsbury Publishing. ISBN 978-0-567-68281-9.
