= Peter Kaufmann (sculptor) =

Austrian-born German sculptor

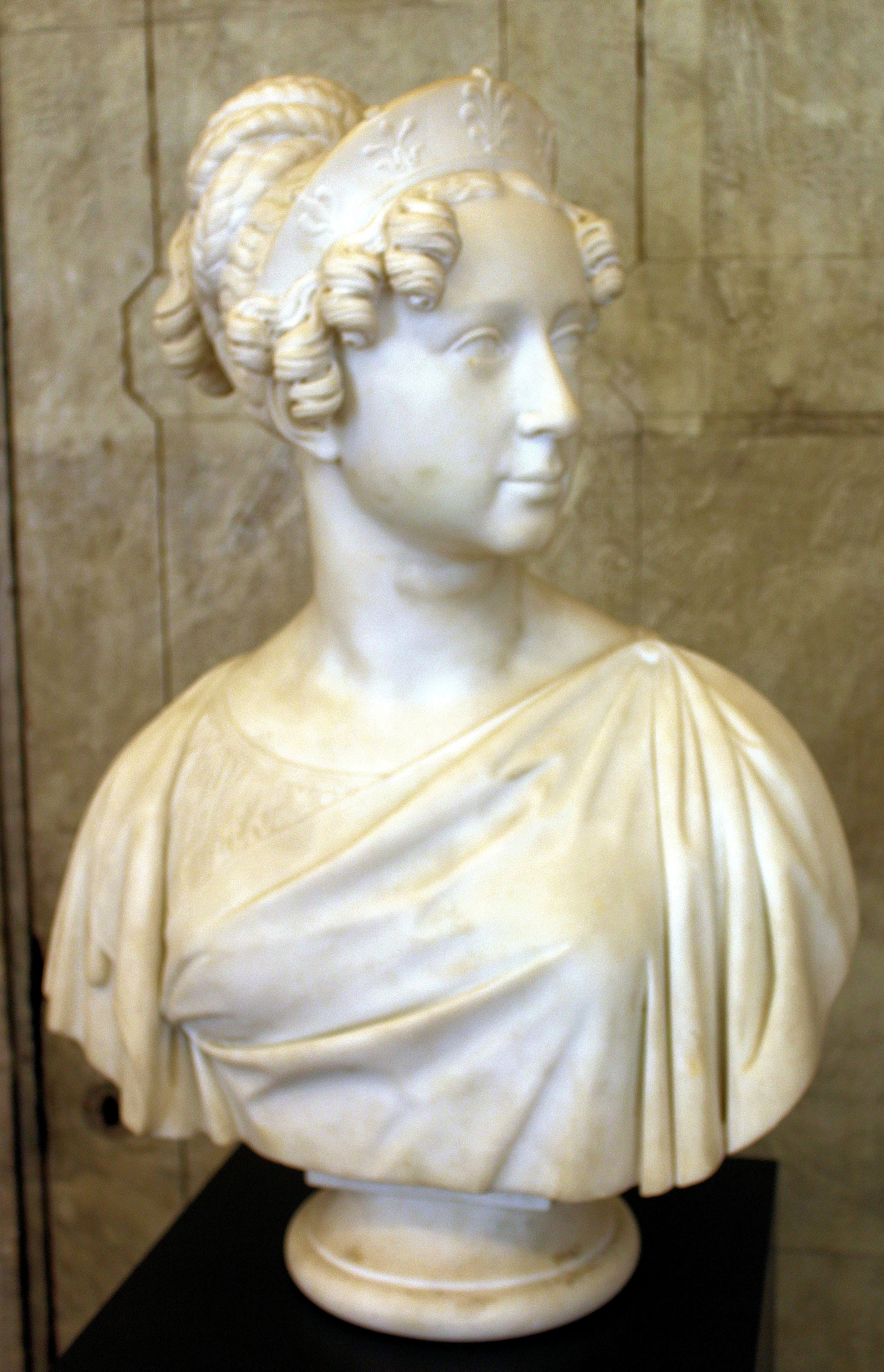
Bust of Grand Duchess Maria Pavlovna

Johann Peter Kaufmann (16 February 1764, Reuthe - 2 August 1829, Weimar) was a German sculptor.

== Life and works ==
His father, Kaspar, was involved in forestry work. His first lessons in wood carving came from him. As a young man, he followed other forestry workers to Alsace, where they found jobs as builders. There, he studied wood sculpting with Gabriel Ignaz Ritter.

After a few years in Paris, he was able to obtain financial support from the Elector of Bavaria, Charles Theodore, that enabled him to study in Rome, where he worked with Bertel Thorvaldsen and Antonio Canova. He also became acquainted with the painter, Angelica Kaufmann, a distant cousin. They supported each other, and she left him a consideration in her will. He would stay in Rome for over twenty years and, at an unknown date, married Barbara Garzes, of Spanish origin. They had two sons: the elder, Ludwig (1800-1855), also became a sculptor.

In 1817, upon the recommendation of Ferdinand Jagemann (whom he had met in Rome), he was appointed a Court Sculptor for Sachsen-Weimar-Eisenach by Grand Duke Karl August, succeeding Carl Gottlieb Weisser. Barbara refused to move with him, remaining in Rome and receiving a pension. She survived him by ten years.

His earliest works in that position were decorative sculptures in the Park an der Ilm and a gable on the Roman House, belonging to the Grand Duke. He also created several busts and a statue of Christ in the aedicula at the Jakobskirche. In addition, he took some students; notably Angelica Facius.

He died of the "flux" (diarrhea?), which was attributed to overwork.

== Sources ==
- Constantin von Wurzbach: "Kauffmann, Peter." In: Biographisches Lexikon des Kaiserthums Oesterreich (Biographical Lexicon of the Empire of Austria). Part 11 Kaiserlich-königliche Hof- und Staatsdruckerei, Vienna 1864, p. 58 (digitalised).
- Jodok Bär (1882). "Kaufmann, Peter" . Allgemeine Deutsche Biographie (in German). Vol. 15. Leipzig: Duncker & Humblot. pp. 474–476.
- Călin Alexandru Mihai: Johann Peter Kauffmann und die spätklassizistische Skulptur am Weimarer Hof : ein Beitrag zur regionalen Kunstgeschichte Thüringens, Cluj-Napoca 2004 ISBN 973-86710-9-4
- Simone Steger: Die Bildnisbüsten der Walhalla bei Donaustauf : von der Konzeption durch Ludwig I. von Bayern zur Ausführung (1807–1842), Diss. Munich 2011. (Online)
