= Seven-branched candelabrum (Essen) =

Candlestand in Essen Cathedral, c. 1000 AD

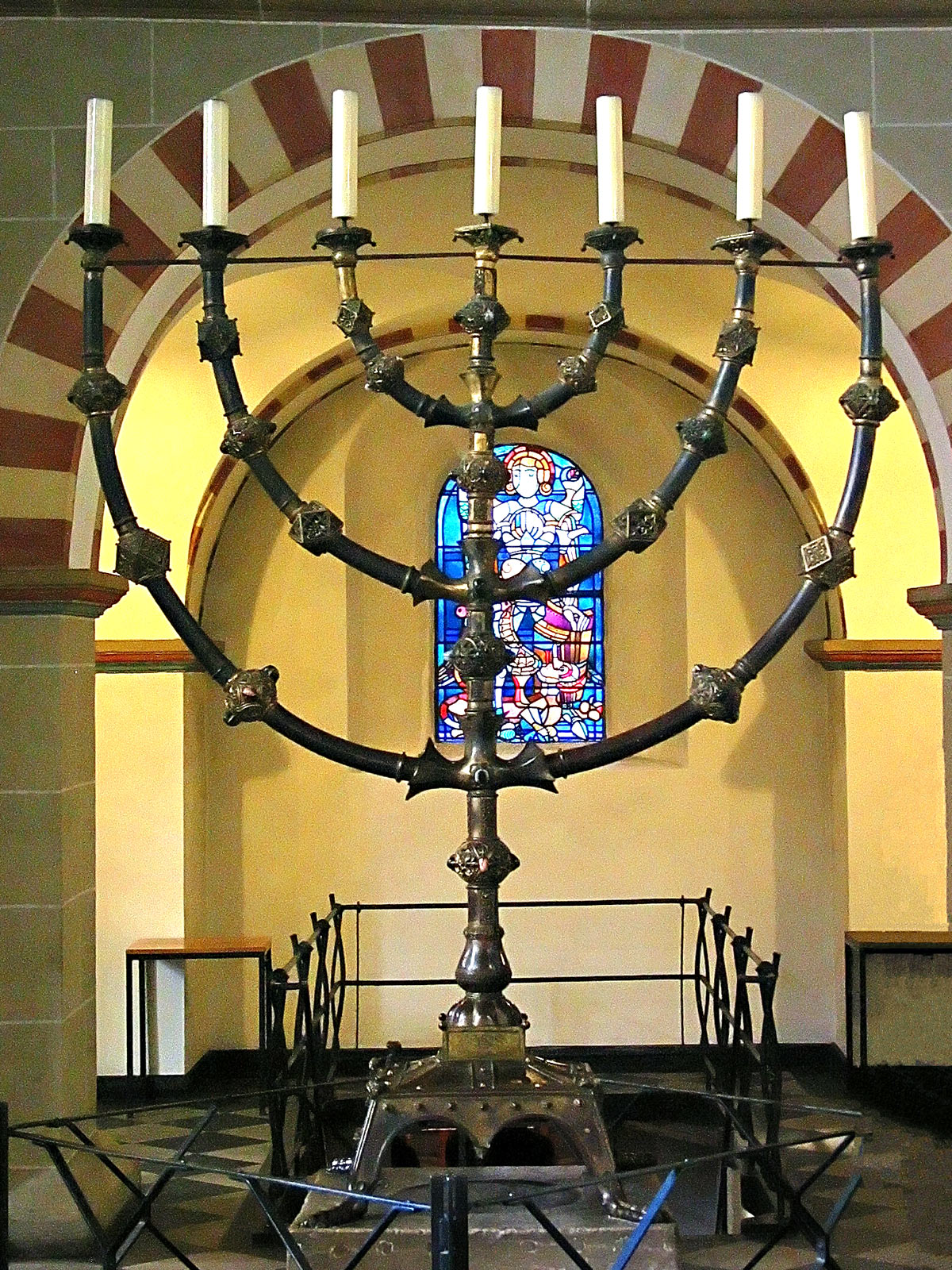
The seven-branched candelabrum, in the background Michael's window of the west choir

The Seven-Branched Candelabrum is a large candlestand from the Essen Cathedral Treasury. Today, it stands on the ground floor of the Westwork of Essen Cathedral. The lampstand, which dates to around the year 1000, is a significant bronze artwork of the early Middle Ages and the oldest preserved seven-armed church candelabrum.

== Description ==
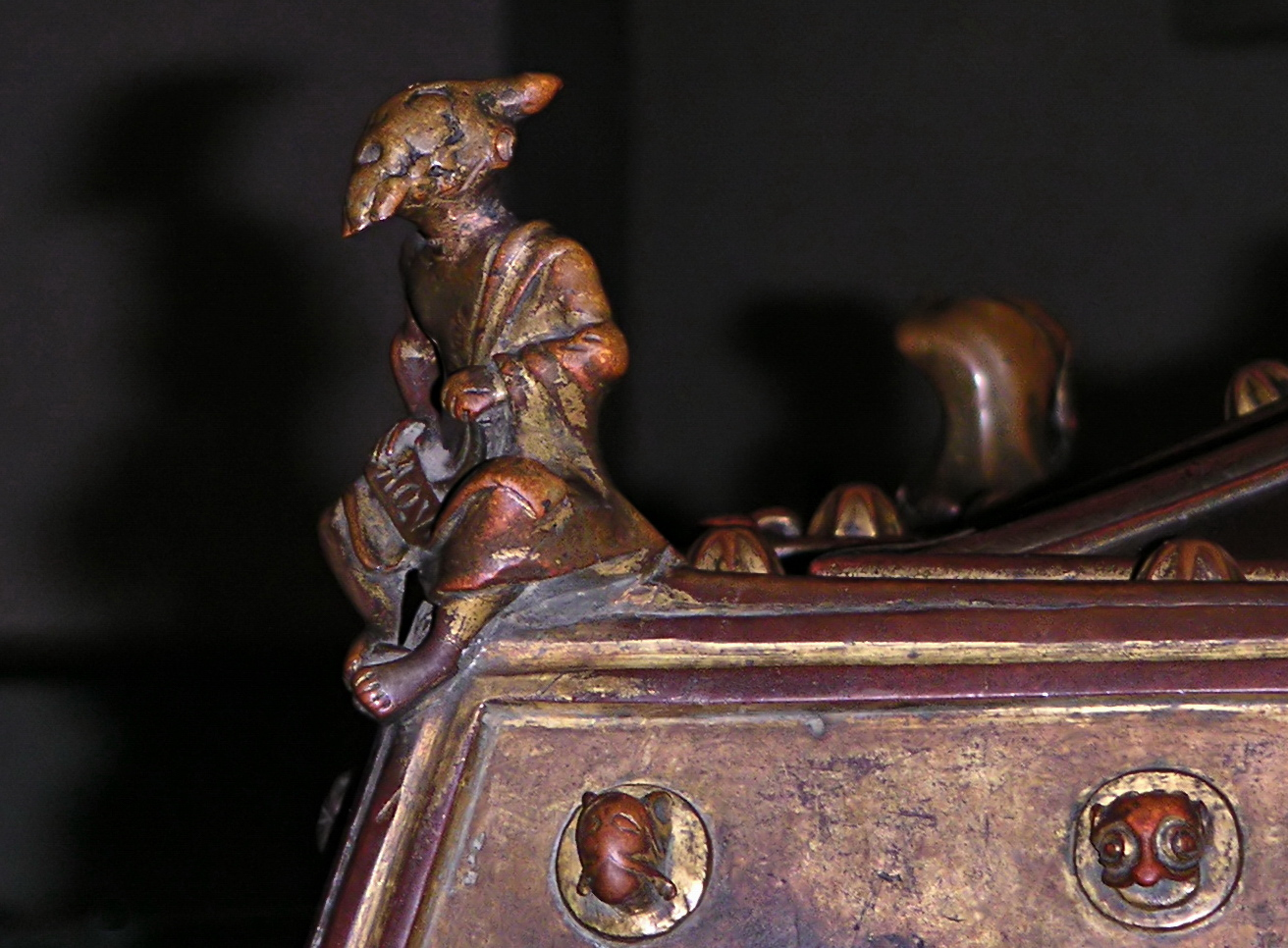
The satyr holding the scroll "Aquilo".

The candelabrum measures 2.26 meters in height and boasts a span of 1.88 meters. Crafted through the hollow casting technique, it showcases the skillful use of bronze and consists of 46 individual components, all supported by an internal iron frame. Resting on a square stone base approximately 60 cm high, which is believed to be a Roman spolia, originally a pedestal or a consecration altar. The object exhibits a square base with inclined walls and a tent-shaped roof supported by four lion claws with three toes each. Four small bronze figures portraying satyrs occupy the base's corners, representing the cardinal points. Among these figures, only the one inscribed as Aquilo (North) remains intact, while the figures inscribed as Oriens (East) and Occidens (West) are partially preserved. The fourth figure was probably inscribed Meridies (South). Elaborately adorned with ribbons and rivets shaped like miniature devil masks, the base culminates with a balustrade-like structure from which the stem of the candelabrum emerges. At one end of the foot of the object, there is a horizontal band that contains an inscription. The inscription reads: "Mathild abatissa me fieri jussit et Christo consecravit" (The abbess Mathild commissioned me and consecrated me to Christ). This inscription aids in dating the candelabrum, as Mathilde served as the abbess of the women's monastery in Essen from 973 to 1011. The trunk of the seven-branched candelabrum is evenly divided into vertical tendril fields, each interrupted by a spherical knob at the center. Three sets of arms branch out from three calyx-shaped connectors, which elliptically curve upward and terminate at the same level as the candle plate that closes the trunk. The arms feature a smooth surface and exhibit alternating spherical and polygonal knobs adorned with stylized leaf motifs and embedded gemstones such as heliotropes, smoky quartz, various agates, amethysts, malachites, jaspers, and rock crystals. It is presumed that the entire candelabrum was originally gilded.

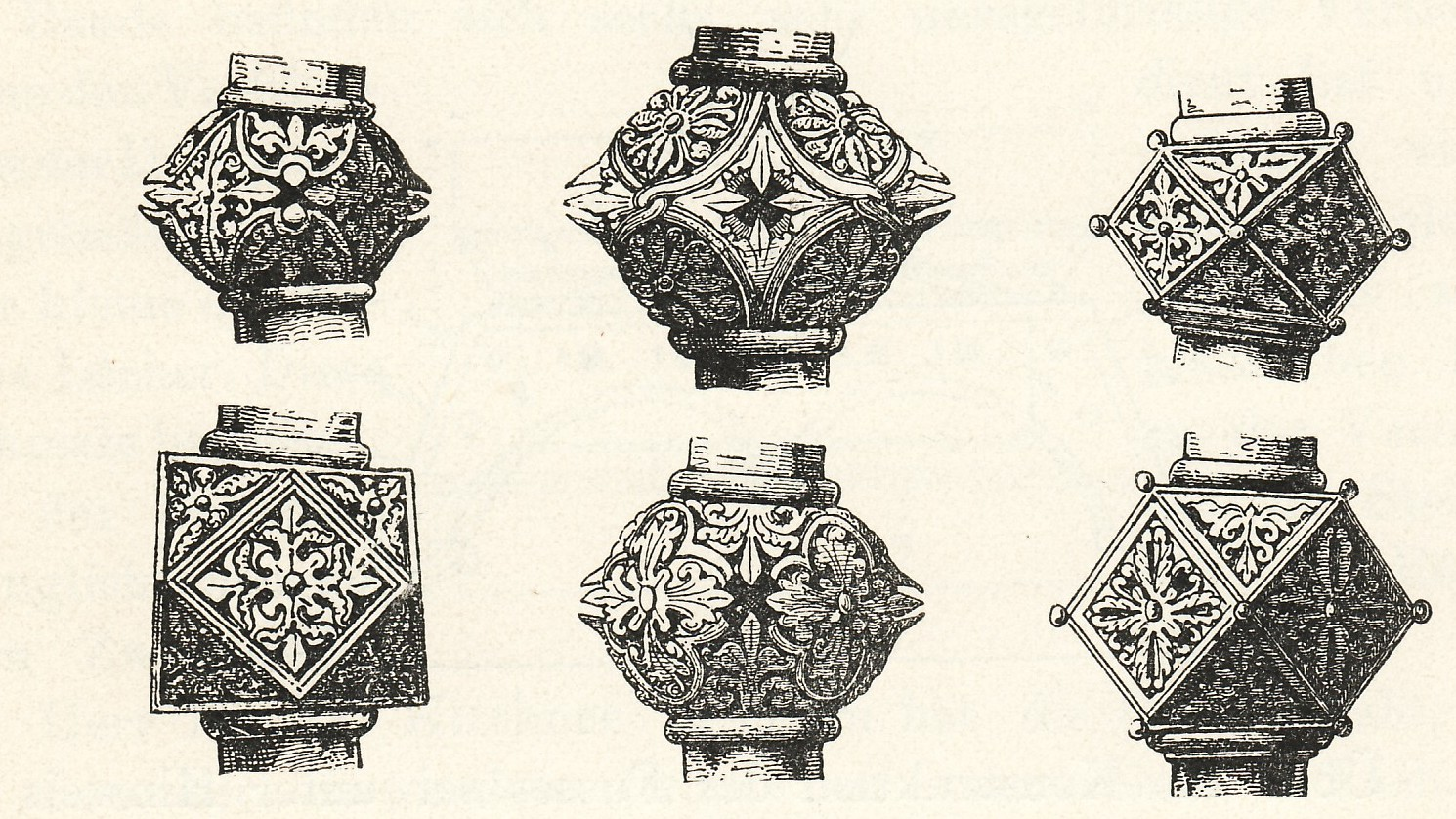
Detailed drawings of the knobs by Georg Humann

Since both Byzantine elements in the ornaments and Lower Saxon influences are detectable, it is assumed that the candelabrum was made in northwestern Germany, possibly in Hildesheim, where other important bronze works of art were created a little later with Bernward Door and Christ Column; however, the location of manufacture is unknown. Manufacturing in Essen itself is being proposed for the Marsus shrine and the cross with the big smelters, which Klaus Gereon Beuckers proved a production in Essen. The fact that the client had to provide the material and was able to monitor its use during production on-site speaks in favor of Essen.

== Interpretation ==
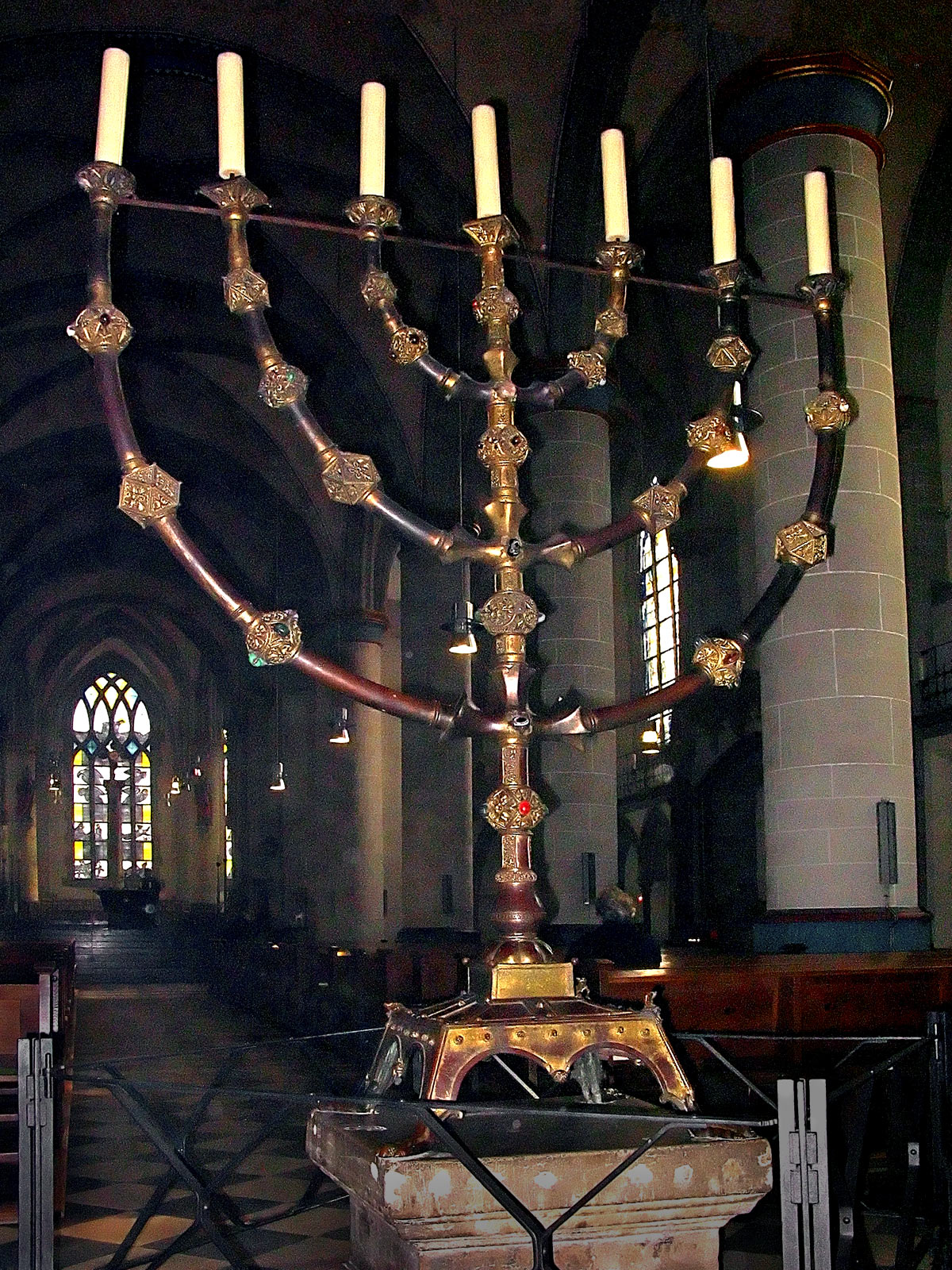
The candelabrum from a different perspective

The seven-branched candelabrum in Essen Cathedral corresponds to the Jewish menorah and derives from the same Old Testament in the second book of Moses (Exodus 37:17-24). In early Christianity, the "seven" symbolized the unity of the divine and the earthly, as it united the "three" of the Trinity and the "four" of the earthly cardinal points. At the same time, the number seven stood for the seven gifts of the Holy Spirit, while the lampstand stood for Christ himself. The candelabrum symbolizes at the same time the light of the world, which shines in all four directions of the wind represented by the bronze figures of the foot, in order to bring all people home to Christ at the end of all days. This reference to the final judgment over all people and the resurrection from the dead allows for the interpretation that Abbess Mathilde had it made as her memorial lampstand.

== History ==
The original placement of the candelabrum is unknown. It is believed to have served as a memorial for Matilda and may have been located near her grave, which is thought to be in the crypt of the collegiate church. The location changed several times when the church was renovated: in the 14th century, when the sacred procedures of the services in the monastery were recorded in the liber ordinarius, it stood in the central nave near the crossing and thus close to the altar of the crossing, later it stood for a time in the choir room. It was transferred to its present location in the west wing in 1958 when space had to be made to accommodate the bishop's throne due to the remodeling of the choir.

The candelabrum was considered to have a relatively modest material value, which made it less threatened of theft compared to other valuable artworks in the cathedral treasury. While the valuable gold and silver treasures such as the Golden Madonna or the Otto Mathilden Cross were taken away or hidden during the Thirty Years' War, during the First Coalition War, and during the Ruhr uprising, the seven-branched candelabrum was only dismantled and taken out of storage during the Second World War. Because of this, it also survived the destruction of Essen Cathedral by an air raid during the night of March 5-6, 1943.

The candelabrum has been restored several times, most recently in 1987. It was previously photogrammetrically measured in all details so that today it would be possible to create an exact facsimile. As early as 1873, two duplicates of the Essen Seven-Branched candelabrum were made, one for the Victoria and Albert Museum in London, the other for the Berlin museums.

== Usage ==
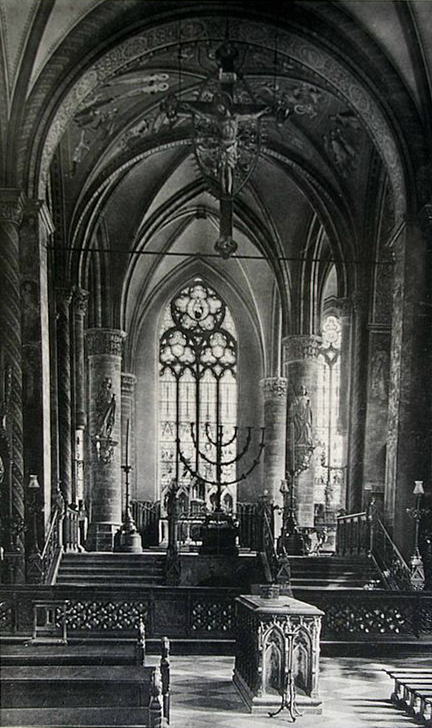
The chancel of the Minster church in 1904, recognizable by the candelabrum in the chancel and the Altfrid tomb in the foreground

Little is known about the historical use of the candelabrum. The liber ordinarius reflects the liturgical situation in Essen Abbey almost four hundred years after the candelabrum's creation. Although the manuscript is presumably based on older models, to what extent the scribes took over from these models is still unknown. The object is infrequently mentioned in the liber ordinarius. However, on the feast of Pentecost, it was the focus of the liturgy: the candles were lit, the scholars knelt around it, and sang a hymn to the risen Christ.

In modern times, the candles of the Seven-Armed candelabrum are lit on Solemnity as well as on particularly noteworthy events such as the bishop's inaugurations.

== Literature ==
- Peter Bloch, Siebenarmige Leuchter in christlichen Kirchen. In: Wallraf-Richartz-Jahrbuch 23, 1961, pp. 55–190.
- Peter Bloch: Der Stil des Essener Leuchters. In: Das erste Jahrtausend, 2. Textband 1, Schwann, Düsseldorf 1962, pp. 534–548.
- Vera Henkelmann (2007), Der Siebenarmige Leuchter des Essener Münsters und die Memoria der Äbtissin Mathilde. In: Birgitta Falk, Thomas Schilp, Michael Schlagheck (Hrsg.): wie das Gold den Augen leuchtet. Schätze aus dem Essener Frauenstift., pp. 151–167, ISBN 978-3-89861-786-4.
- Georg Humann: Die Kunstwerke der Münsterkirche zu Essen. Düsseldorf 1904.
- Leonhard Küppers: Das Essener Münster. Fredebeul & Koenen, Essen 1963.
- Leonhard Küppers, Paul Mikat: Der Essener Münsterschatz. Fredebeul & Koenen, Essen 1963, pp. 48–52.
- Alfred Pothmann (2000), Der Essener Kirchenschatz aus der Frühzeit der Stiftsgeschichte. In: Günther Berghaus, Thomas Schilp (Hrsg.): Herrschaft, Bildung und Gebet. Gründung und Anfänge des Frauenstifts Essen. Klartext-Verlag, Essen 2000, pp. 135–153, ISBN 3-88474-907-2.
