= Essen Crown =

Ottonian dynasty golden crown

Essen crown
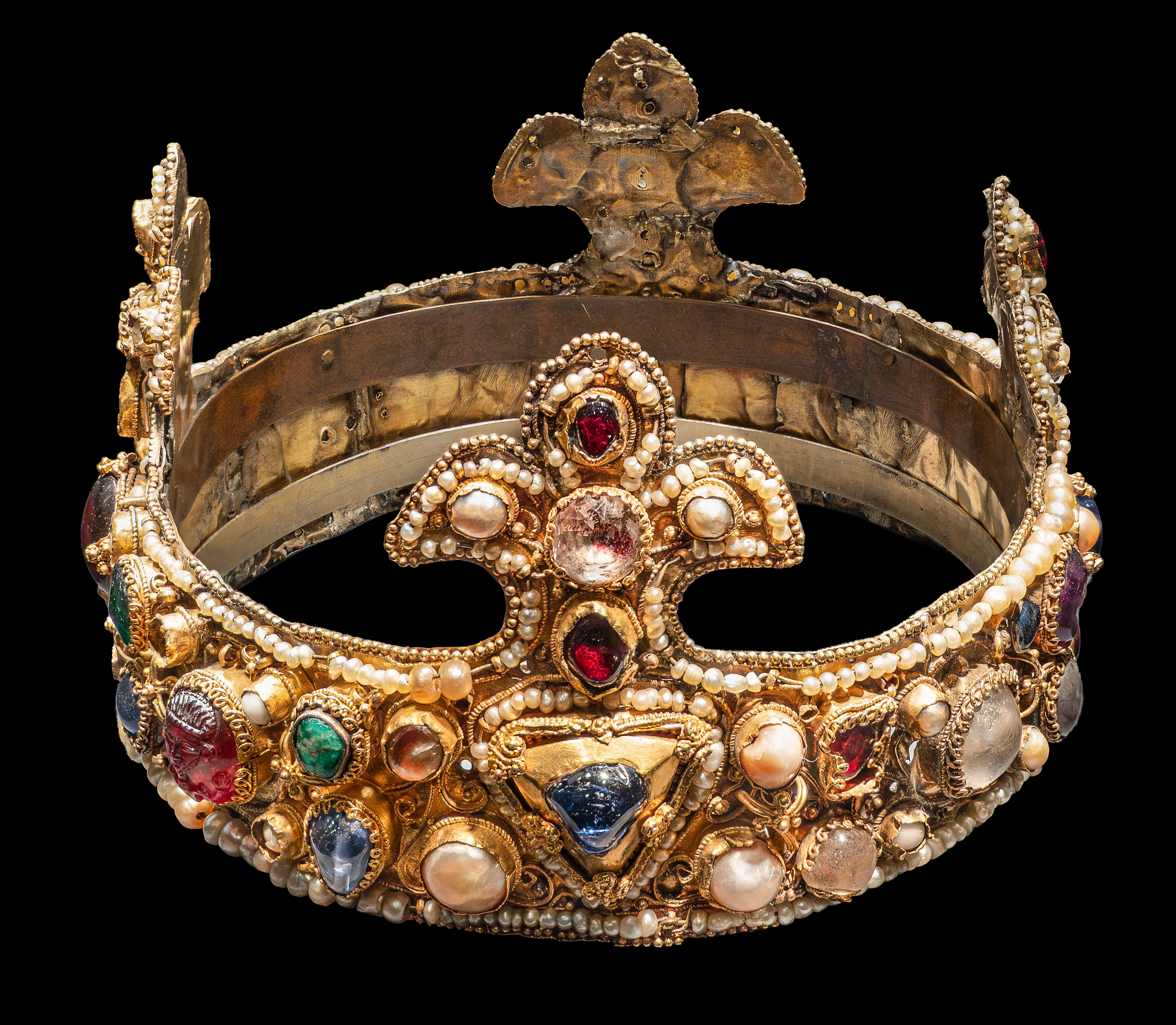
- The crown in the Essen Cathedral Treasury, with the sapphire at front

Details
- Country: Germany
- Made: X century
- Arches: None
- Material: Gold and iron
- Cap: None
- Notable stones: Pearls, gemstones

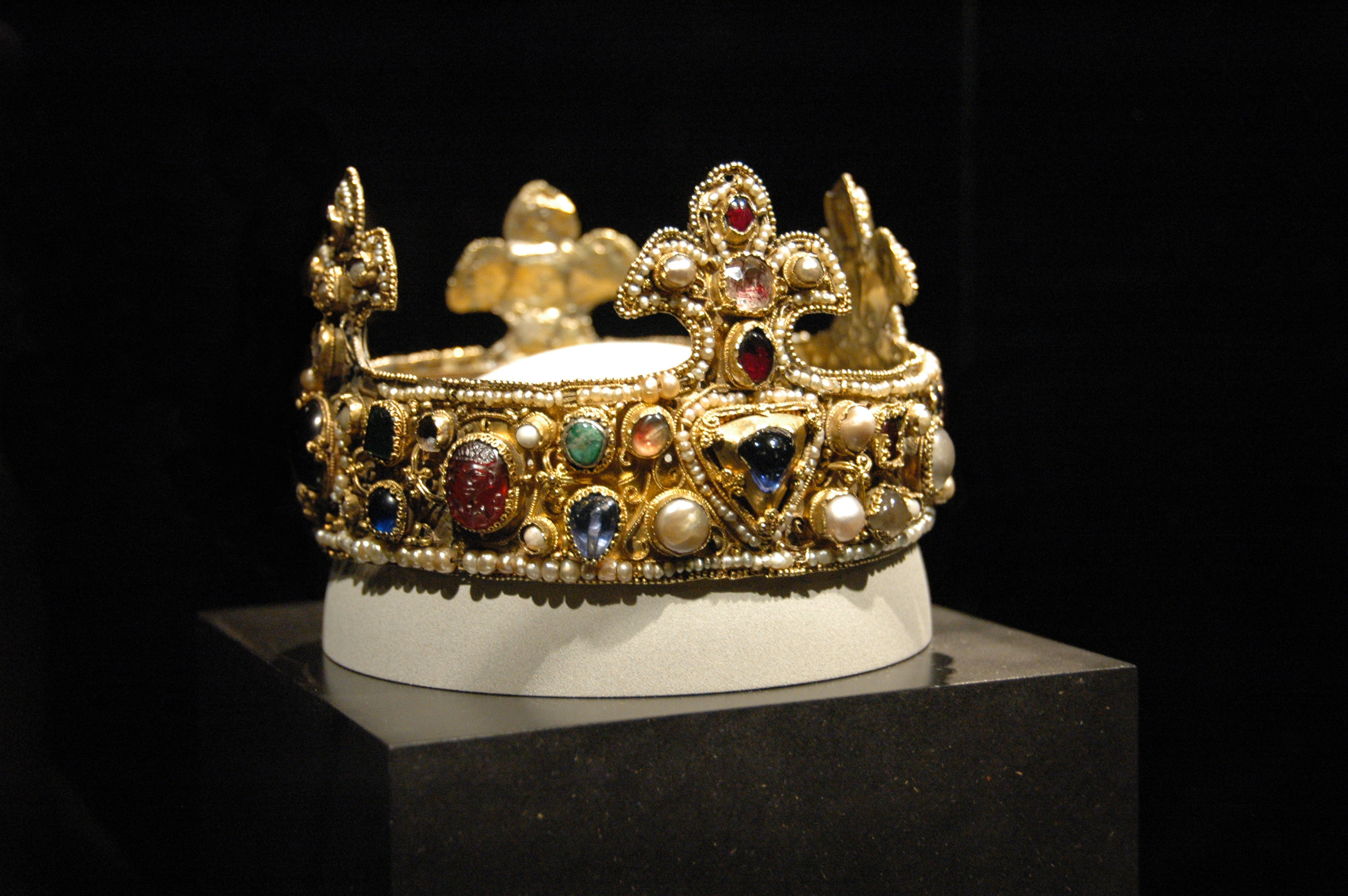
The crown as part of the exhibition Gold vor Schwarz, 2008

The Essen Crown (German: Essener Krone) is an Ottonian golden crown in the Essen Cathedral Treasury. It was formerly claimed that it might have been the crown with which the three-year-old Otto III was crowned King of the Romans in 983, which is the source of its common name, the Childhood Crown of Otto III (Kinderkrone Ottos III). However, this idea most probably derives from the wishful thinking of early twentieth century historians of Essen and it is now widely rejected. However it is certainly the oldest surviving lily crown in the world.

== Description ==
In its shape the crown recalls a Byzantine circlet. The band is 3.5 cm wide and its diameter is now 12.5 cm, having been adjusted to fit the head of the Golden Madonna. A regular border of precious stones runs along the whole circumference. The main circlet is made of gold which has been heavily alloyed with silver; a second circlet of pure gold has been soldered onto the outside. An iron reinforcing ring is visible on the outside.

The upper and lower edges of the crown are decorated with pearls strung on a metal wire attached to the circlet by metal rings. Numerous pearls and gemstones decorate the main body of the crown and the lilies, with particularly precious stones placed directly under the lilies. Highlights include a Late Antique engraved gem depicting the head of Medusa and a sapphire in a triangular gold ring at the front of the crown.

Comparable (but later) crowns are in the possession of the church treasuries of Hildesheim and Conques in France.

== History ==
The origin of the crown is unclear. For a long time it was claimed that the crown was made for the coronation of Otto III in 983 and had been gifted to Essen Abbey by him. Essen Abbey, under the leadership of Abbess Mathilde, who was a granddaughter of Otto I, had a particularly close relationship to the Ottonian royal family, as demonstrated by significant donations by the kings and also in the fact that the sister of Otto III (who like the Abbess was also called Mathilde) was educated at Essen. At the beginning of February 993, therefore, Otto III made a visit to the Abbey of Essen for Candlemas, at which time local historians suggested that he made two major donations.

The first of these was a sword of Damascus steel which was probably made in 950 and shows signs of use on the blade. This sword was venerated, probably on account of its former owner, and an expensive golden sheath was made at Essen for the sword. In later times the sword was reputed to be the Sword of Saints Cosmas and Damian and was included in Essen's civic coat of arms. For modern scholarship, a better understanding of the relationship of Essen Abbey and the Ottonian family provided an answer to the question of who the original owner of the sword really was.

Otto III's second gift might have been the golden crown. Written evidence for this is lacking, but there were circumstantial arguments for it. Firstly, based on art historical comparisons, the crown was dated to the end of the tenth century. The existence of the iron reinforcing ring was taken as evidence that the crown had been reworked for the Golden Madonna's head and, therefore, had originally been designed for another purpose, which it was concluded could only have the coronation of a child, since it would still have been too small for an adult. The coronation of Otto III in 983 at Aachen Cathedral is the only coronation of a child which occurred within the right time period. Furthermore, the medieval practice of crowning a statue of Madonna on 2 February during Michaelmas is first attested at Essen. Thus it was suggested that the practice commemorated the gift of the crown to the abbey during his visit to Essen at the beginning of February 993, which would have coincided with the feast day.

Modern dating puts the modification of the crown in the middle of the eleventh century. At that time several of the artworks at Essen were modified: the Cross of Theophanu and the Theophanu reliquary of the Holy Nail were decorated enamels and the halo of the Golden Madonna which made it difficult to crown the statue was removed. This suggests that the crowning ritual originated only a little before this, probably around 1040/50.

In current scholarship it is thought that the crown itself dates to the beginning of the eleventh century on account of the decorative elements known as lilies and beehives, which are very similar to artworks made at the time of Henry II. Such artworks in the Essen Cathedral Treasury include the ends of the cross with the large enamels, which is believed to have been created under Abbess Sophia (1011–1039). In that case, the crown would have originally been made for the ritual coronation of the golden Madonna. Furthermore, the regularity of the crown's decoration makes it unlikely that it was ever actually resized. Sometimes the crown is now even dated to the latter half of the eleventh century.

For centuries, nothing important happened to the crown. Then, in 1988, it was depicted on a charity stamp of the Deutsche Bundespost as an outstanding example of Ottonian goldsmithery.

== Bibliography ==
- Georg Humann. Die Kunstwerke der Münsterkirche zu Essen. Schwann, Düsseldorf 1904, pp. 261–266.
- Alfred Pothmann. "Der Essener Kirchenschatz aus der Frühzeit der Stiftsgeschichte." In: Herrschaft, Bildung und Gebet. Gründung und Anfänge des Frauenstifts Essen. Klartext, Essen 2000, ISBN 3-88474-907-2, pp. 135–153.
- Birgitta Falk. "Essener Krone" In Gold vor Schwarz. Der Essener Domschatz auf Zollverein, edited by Birgitta Falk, Exhibition Catalog 2008. Klartext Verlag, Essen 2008, ISBN 978-3-8375-0050-9, pp. 92–93.
