= Cross of Mathilde =

Ottonian processional cross

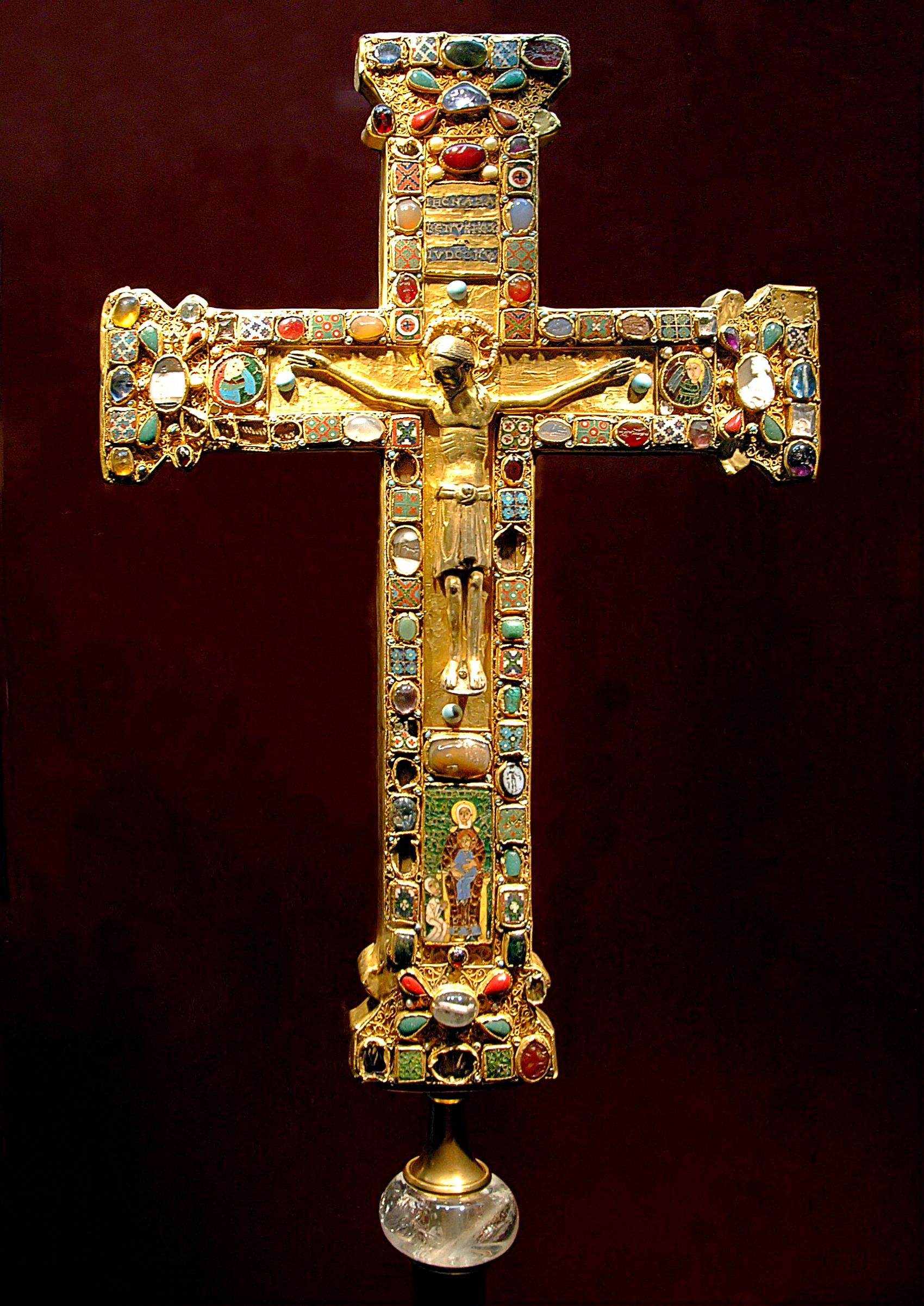
The Cross of Mathilde in the Essen Cathedral Treasury

The Cross of Mathilde (German: Mathildenkreuz; Latin: Crux Matildae) is an Ottonian processional cross in the crux gemmata style which has been in Essen in Germany since it was made in the 11th century. It is named after Abbess Mathilde (died in 1011) who is depicted as the donor on a cloisonné enamel plaque on the cross's stem. It was made between about 1000, when Mathilde was abbess, and 1058, when Abbess Theophanu died; both were princesses of the Ottonian dynasty. It may have been completed in stages, and the corpus, the body of the crucified Christ, may be a still later replacement. The cross, which is also called the "second cross of Mathilde", forms part of a group along with the Cross of Otto and Mathilde or "first cross of Mathilde" from late in the preceding century, a third cross, sometimes called the Senkschmelz Cross, and the Cross of Theophanu from her period as abbess. All were made for Essen Abbey, now Essen Cathedral, and are kept in Essen Cathedral Treasury, where this cross is inventory number 4.

== Description ==
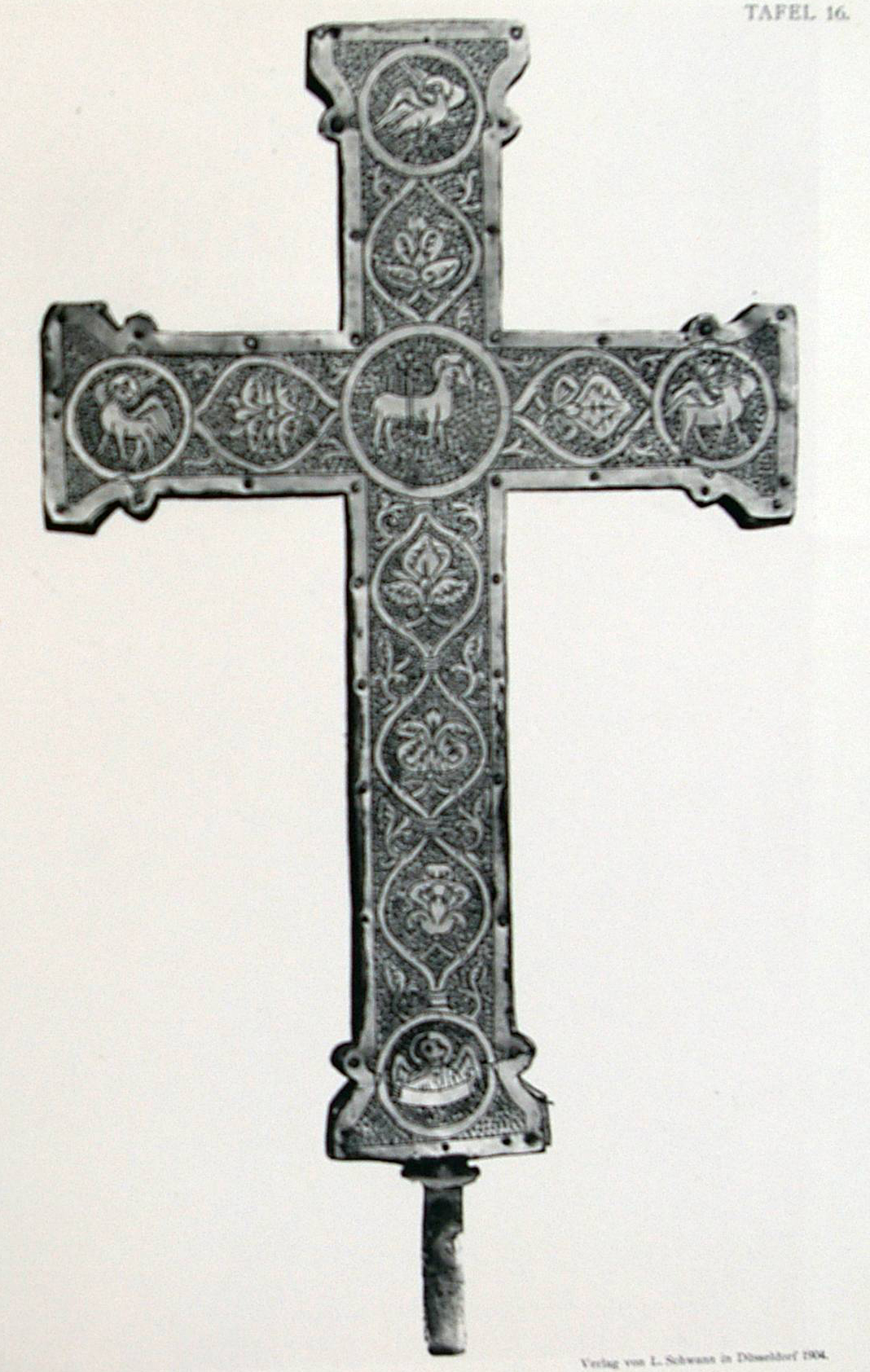
The reverse of the Cross of Mathilde

The Cross of Mathilde is 45 cm (18 in) tall and 30.5 cm (12.0 in) wide and the cross beams are 6.3 cm (2.5 in) wide and 2.2 cm (0.87 in) deep. It consists of an oak core covered in gold sheet. Under the cross is a modern glass ball which serves as a handle. The ends of the Latin cross are flared in a way found in Mathilde's First Cross and the Ottonian Cross of Lothair at Aachen. The narrow sides and reverse of the Cross of Mathilde are covered with gilt copper. On the reverse it is decorated with a punchmarked Agnus Dei which is accompanied by the four Evangelists' symbols. On the obverse there is a crucifix cast in bronze and gilt, with three cavities for holding relics: two in the back and one in the occiput. To the left and right of the crucifix there are enamel roundels with personifications of the Sun and the Moon, surrounded by four pearls each and by filigreework. Above the crucifix is the normal cross inscription in enamel: IHC NAZA/RENVS REX / IVDEORV (Jesus of Nazareth, King of the Jews), above which there is a large red stone surrounded by four pearls. Under the crucifix there is a brown cameo gem of a lion and under that there is an enamel plate with the donor portrait which depicts Mathilde (named) in monastic clothing, kneeling in prayer before the Madonna. The central area with the crucifix, donor portrait, cross inscription, sun, moon and lion cameo is bordered by a strip of alternating enamel plates and stones, each surrounded by four pearls. At the end of each cross beam there are four teardrop-shaped, coloured stones around a central stone. On the right arm, the central stone is a cameo with a female bust looking left. On the left arm it is an intaglio cut in a piece of striped onyx, showing a helmeted soldier in profile, holding a spear.

The Cross of Mathilde is generally considered the weakest of the four Essen processional crosses in artistic terms, Pothmann considers the artistry and craftsmanship to be not as high as the others. In 1904, Humann described it as a "cluttered grandeur and, every respect, a cruder image." The assessment of the cross is significantly complicated by an undocumented restoration which must have occurred between 1904 and 1950. In this restoration the edging enamels were melted, allowing the colours underneath to be seen.

=== Crucifix ===
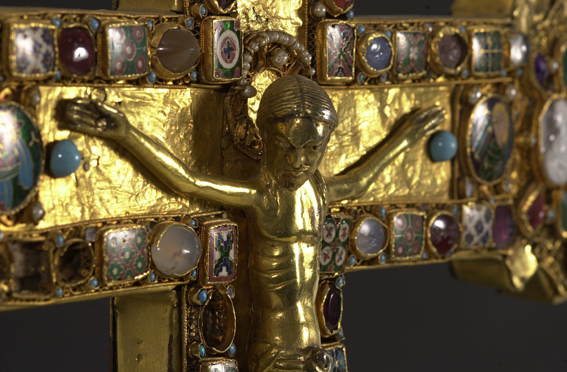
Crucifix detail

Jesus stands on a suppedaneum, with his legs together. The feet are not nailed. The loincloth is knotted in the middle and falls evenly in broad folds. The arms are slightly unequal in length. The head is bent to the side and is surrounded by a halo which is attached to the horizontal member of the cross and is not adjusted to take account of the tilt of the head. Humann calls the position of the body clumsy and awkward. Until 2010, the cavities on his back side contained three small relic packets, which were held in place by ties. The relics had been associated with the cross from its creation. The relic in the lowest cavity was wrapped in a purple-coloured piece of taffeta and lacks a cedula. A nocent relic wrapped in white linen is in the middle cavity with an accompanying cedula, from Innocent I (r.401-417). The script, Carolingian minuscule dates this to the 10th or 11th century and localises it to the scriptorium of Essen Abbey. There are three further fragmentary parchment cedulae on cloth fragments in the cavity in the head. The script of these has typical elements of the Essen scriptorium; one of the fragments can be attributed to Lawrence of Rome (†258). The cross thus contained relics of Saints Lawrence and Innocent. Both of these saints were very important to the Ottonian dynasty to which Mathilde belonged: Innocent was patron saint of the oldest Ottonian abbey, Gandersheim and Otto I, Abbess Mathilde's grandfather, attributed his success in the Battle of Lechfeld (955) to Lawrence. The relic packets and cedulae are now stored in the Cathedral treasury chamber separately under inventory numbers MK1 to MK4.

=== Enamels ===
The Cross of Mathilde was equipped with forty enamel tablets, of which 37 remain: the enamel with the donor portrait, the enamel with the cross inscription, two round enamels with the personifications of the Sun and the Moon, and 33 ornamental enamels. Three further ornamental enamels were lost before the first description of the cross. Of all the objects in the Essen treasury, the Cross of Mathilde is the most richly decorated with enamel. All the enamel frames are filigreed.

==== Donor portrait ====
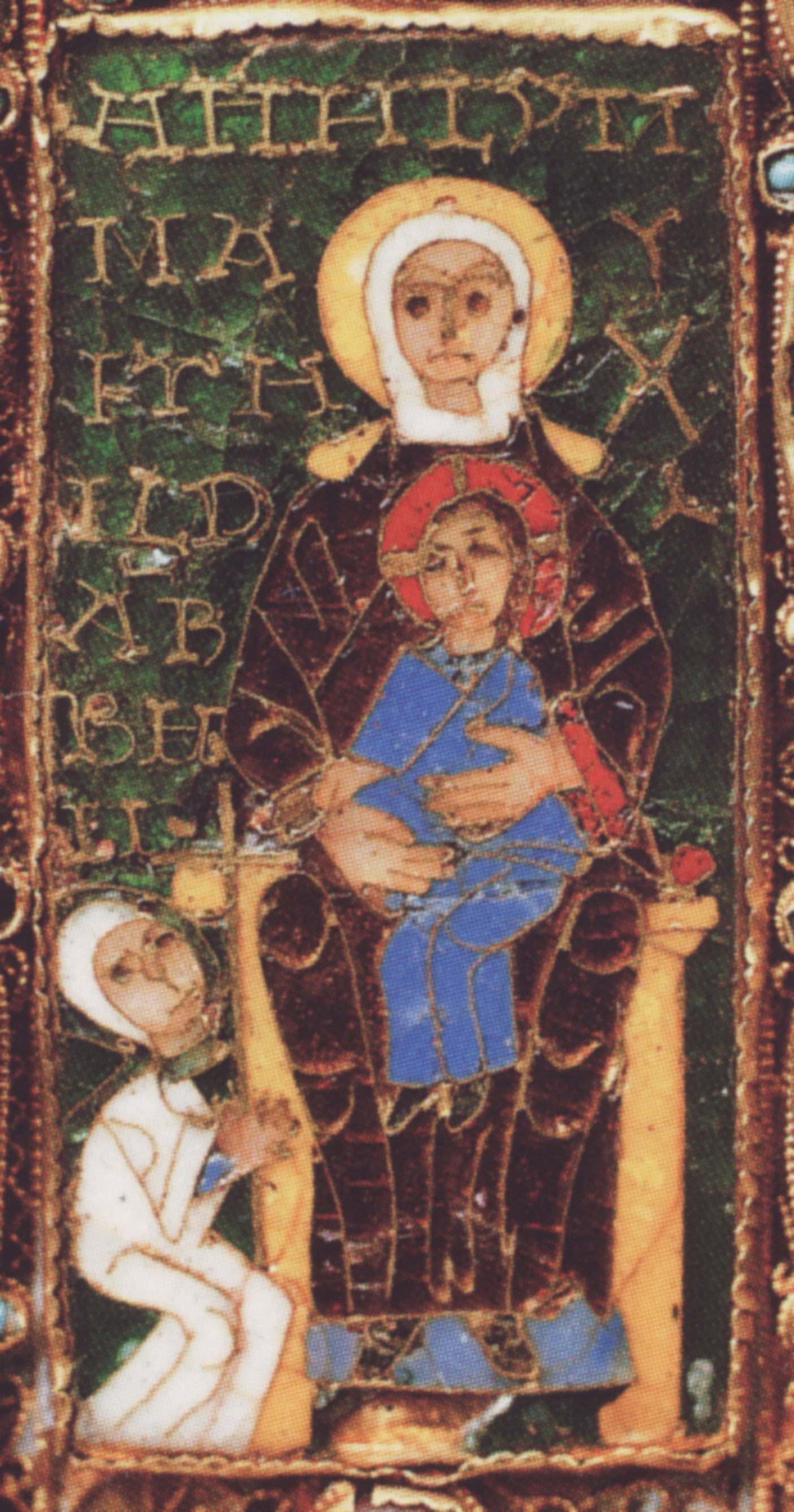
The enamel plaque with the donor portrait

The donor enamel is 6 cm × 2.9 cm (2.4 in × 1.1 in) in size. Its iconic "Seat of Wisdom" shows an enthroned Madonna in frontal view on the right, holding her son on her left knee, in front of a figure dressed in the white robes of a monastic. The monastic holds a cross with both hands, which she offers to the baby Jesus. The child stretches both hands towards the cross in a gesture of acceptance. An inscription MA/HTH/ILD / AB/BH/II makes it possible to identify the monastic as the Abbess Mathilde. The inscription is probably faulty, with the second word to be read as ABBATI(SSA). Above and to the right of the Madonna are two further inscriptions, which are incomprehensible. It is theorised that they are mutilated versions of Greek inscriptions. The epigraphist Sonja Hermann suggests that the enameller confused the third and fourth letters and has inverted a Τ, which would yield ΜΗΤΗΡ (μήτηρ - "mother"). Hermann would read the symbols on the right, which are arranged vertically, as ΙΥ ΧΥ as an abbreviation of Ι(ησο)ύ Χ(ριστο)ύ ("of Jesus Christ").

The background of the enamel is in translucent green, with the letters set in gold. Mary's head is surrounded by an opaque yellow halo and she wears a white hood as well as a translucent brown-violet robe with red ochre sleeves. Robe and sleeves are harmonised by a single gold wire outline. Mary sits on a yellow throne, with her feet in grey shoes placed on a blue footrest. Her face is beige, with her circular eyes in the same colour as the face. Eyebrows, nose and mouth are depicted with gold wire. The hieratic pose of Mary is a notable feature of the Sedes Sapentiae.

The child sits on Mary's left knee, his legs hanging down between her knees. Jesus has a red halo with a gold cross. His face is detailed in gold, like Mary's. Christ wears a blue robe, with gold wire indicating folds in it, and grey shoes. Mathilde's clothing is made up of a tight white robe of a monastic, with a white hood which is detailed with gold wire. Under the robe, as is visible on her arms, she wears a blue undergarment. The cross which she holds upright is delineated with broader gold wire. Since the vertical cross beam merges into the side of the throne and the horizontal cross beam merges into the throne's armrest, the cross itself is difficult to make out. Mathilde's line of sight passes through the transept of her cross and Christ's hand to the face of her saviour.

This donor portrait shows parallels with the donor portrait on the cover of the Theophanu Gospels, in which Theophanu in a similar but more horizontal pose, presents her donation to an enthroned Mary. Because of the similarity of the posture of the enthroned Madonna to the Golden Madonna of Essen it has been suggested that the actual act of donation was performed in the presence of the statue.

==== Cross inscription ====
The cross inscription IHC NAZA/RENVS REX / IVDEORV is made of golden wire set in a translucent blue background. It is surrounded by a broad gold border, and the lines of the inscription are separated by golden stripes. The letters are made easily readable, but do not reach the precision of their model on the Cross of Otto and Mathilde. The dotting of the gold border, which is characteristic of the workshop of Egbert of Trier, is absent, in contrast to the inscription plaque of the Cross of Otto and Mathilde.

==== Sun and Moon ====
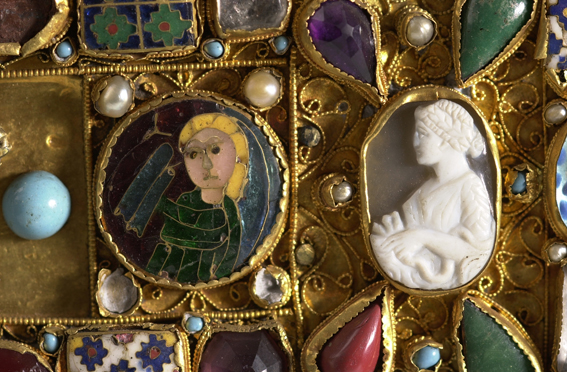
The personification of the Moon and the ancient cameo on the right arm of the cross

The two round enamel medallions with personifications of the Sun and Moon, which symbolise the mourning of all creation at Christ's death, are located on the horizontal beam of the cross. Both personifications look towards Jesus, the Sun from the left and the Moon from the right. The background of the enamel plaque depicting the Sun is green. The bust of the Sun has a mournful expression and its hands are raised to its face. Its brown-violet eyes are round and its eyebrows as well as its bulbous nose are formed with a wire, while its wide open mouth is formed from two other wires. A furrowed brow is formed from a Y-shaped wire, reinforcing the mournful expression. The Sun wears a crown with four jagged rays in his golden hair and holds a cloth before his face.

The enamel plaque of the Moon is made as a mirror image of the Sun's plaque. The Moon also holds a cloth before her face. The enamel is generally darker, the use of wire somewhat better. In contrast to the Sun's enamel, the Moon's clothing and hair are full of wires. For the face, the enameller used a single wire for the nose and the mouth.

==== Enamels of the edging ====
The enamels of the edging alternate with gemstones. In total there are five different motifs in five different colours. Eleven of the enamels have a carpet-like stepped pattern, seven enamels are divided into fields. In five enamels a diagonal cross is the motif, often featuring circular motifs with quatrefoil flowers. The remaining enamels feature modified quatrefoil flowers. Diagonal crosses, stepped patterns and quatrefoil flowers also occur as motifs on the Senkschmelz Cross. The colours employed are translucent bottle green and dark blue as well as opaque white, red, jade green, turquoise, blue and yellow. Several of the enamels have a reversed counterpart, which is sometimes located opposite. It is probable that all of the enamels of the edging were originally paired, so that the appearance of the cross was less chaotic than it is today.

=== Cameos ===
The Cross of Mathilde contains three classical cameo engraved gems, which have a significant iconographic role. On the horizontal beam of the cross is a brownish chalcedony, with a cameo of a lion lying down or sleeping. On the left arm of the cross, a horizontally striated onyx features a warrior with a spear and helmet in profile facing Jesus. Opposite him, on the right arm of the cross is an oval cameo with a lightly carved female bust on a dark background. All the cameos are ancient spolia

The iconographic significance of the cameo gems is not yet completely clear. The lion stands on the vertical beam of the cross in the same spot in which the chased snake appears on the Cross of Otto and Mathilde and in which the Gorgon cameo appears on the Senkschmelz Cross - both of these symbolise evil's defeat as a result of the crucifixion of Christ. The lion cameo can also be put in this symbolic system. But the depiction of the lion lying peacefully might also have another meaning: in the Physiologus, a characteristic of the lion is that it brings its newborn young to life on the third day with its breath, which makes lion a symbol for the resurrection of Christ. The lion cameo could therefore also be interpreted as a reference to the hope for the resurrection of the donor depicted on the enamel plaque below it.

The meaning of the cameos on the horizontal arms is even less clear. The use of these particular items of spolia seems intentional, but a convincing iconographic interpretation of the naked warrior with spear and helmet and the noble women has not yet been made. Since both look towards Jesus, like the Sun and the Moon, it seems possible that they are intended to amplify those images.

== Dating and patroness ==
The Cross of Mathilde is always considered in connection with the other three Ottonian processional crosses of the Essen Cathedral Treasury. Long ago, Humann noticed significant parallels with the Cross of Otto and Mathilde and the Senkschmelz Cross, such that he assumed that the goldsmith of the Cross of Mathilde had knowledge of the Cross of Otto and Mathilde (known to him as the Older Cross of Mathilde). The form and general idea of the Cross of Otto and Mathilde are adopted by the Cross of Mathilde: donor portrait, crucifixion inscription, the crucified Jesus on a golden background, surrounded by an elaborate border. The adoption is particularly significant in the case of the crucifixion inscription, since the inscription on the Cross of Mathilde is directly copied from the older cross. The border is adopted from the Senkschmelz Cross. The Cross of Mathilde must, therefore be younger than these models. In 1904, Humann concluded on the basis of the image of Mathilde on it, that the Cross of Mathilde was made before 1011, the year of her death. On the grounds that the Cross of Mathilde is generally less harmonised, colourful, and technically successful, it was assumed that Mathilde donated it shortly before the end of her life, when she no longer had the superior artist of the Cross of Otto and Mathilde at her disposal. Since the Cross of Otto and Mathilde was often called the "Cross of Mathilde" at that time, he called the cross the "Younger Cross of Mathilde" or the "Second Cross of Mathilde".

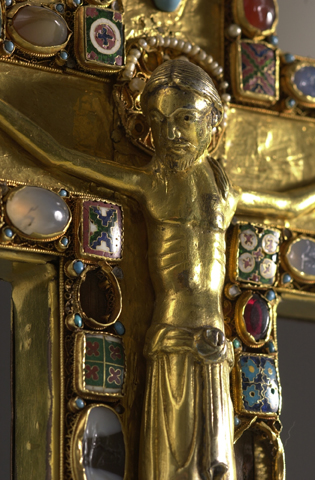
Cross of Mathilde

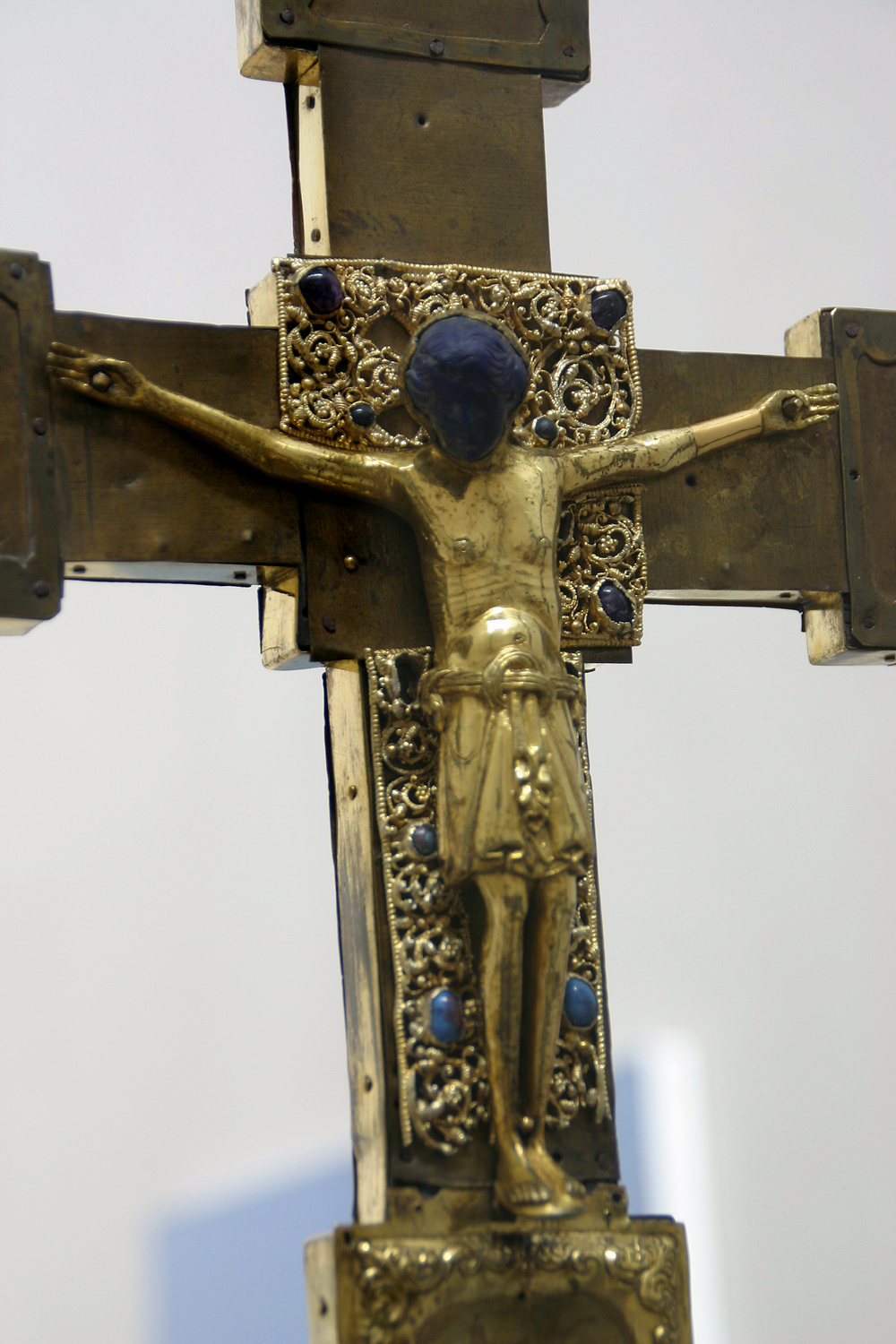
Cross of Hermann and Ida

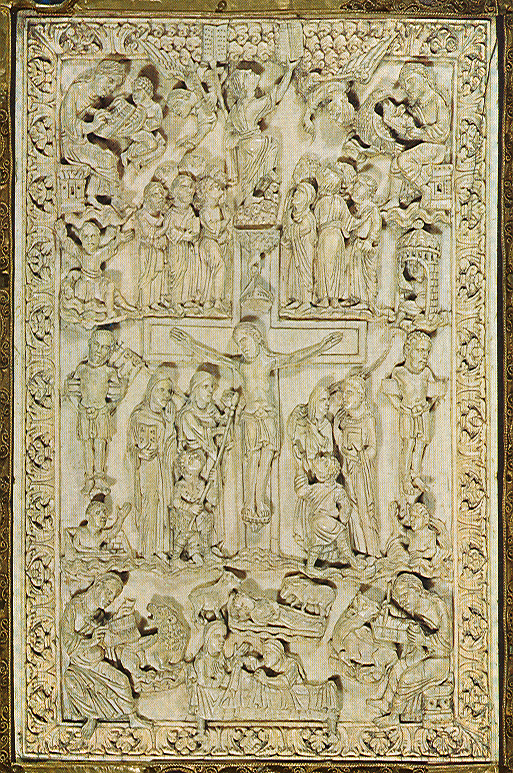
Ivory on the bookcover of the Theophanu Gospels

The stylistic relationship of the crucified Jesus on the Cross of Mathilde is significant in comparison.

The dating of the Cross of Mathilde to before 1011 raised art historical problems. For one thing, individual ornamental motifs are found on the Senkschmelz Cross, which was meant to be created earlier, which only become common later. For another thing, the crucified Jesus of the Cross of Mathilde shows numerous parallels to a group of cast bronze crucifixes, of which the most prominent example is the crucifix on the Cross of Hermann and Ida, which was created at least thirty years after the death of Abbess Mathilde. There are further parallels with the depictions of the cross on Cologne ivory carvings, such as the ivory book cover of the Theophanu Gospels. Since the current crucifix is not fitted on the inside, it was assumed that the Cross of Mathilde was made in the middle of the eleventh century and an original, chased crucifix was replaced by the casts. Since scholars assumed that Abbess Sophia had discontinued several projects of Mathilde, such as the westwerk of Essen Minster or the Marsus shrine, it was also assumed that the Cross of Mathilde was first assembled under Abbess Theophanu, or rather that she had first arranged Mathilde's donation. An argument in favour of this is the similarity of the donor portrait of the Cross of Mathilde to the donor portrait of Theophanu on the book cover of the Theophanu Gospels.

A newer interpretation of the Cross of Mathilde is suggested by Klaus Gereon Beuckers. Making Theophanu herself the donor of the cross, he dates it to c. 1050. The crucifix would then be original. Beuckers included the Cross of Mathilde among the efforts of Theophanu to memorialise Mathilde. Theophanu surrounded Mathilde's grave in the new building consecrated in 1051, the crypt of Theophanu which is known today as the Altfrid Crypt, with a memorial structure, increasing the liturgical importance of her predecessor in order to increase the importance of the Abbey. Theophanu, therefore, would have had new enamel made for the Cross of Mathilde, which directly recalled the older enamel already at Essen. Beuckers supposes therefore that the Cross of Mathilde was made in Essen. Since the only enamels used on the older treasures of Theophanu (the Holy Nail Gospels and the Cross of Theophanu), Theophanu probably put the enamel workshop which had made the Senkschmelz Cross and the Marsus shrine under Mathilde, back into operation for the manufacture of the Cross of Mathilde.

== History ==
From its creation, the cross has been located in Essen, except for evacuations during wars and other crises. On account of the depiction of Mathilde and the similarities with two other crosses of the Cathedral Treasury, which were also donations to Essen, it is assumed that it belonged to the Abbey continuously from its donation until the secularisation of Essen Abbey in 1802. However, the sources for the Essen Cathedral Treasury do not explicitly mention the cross. The Inventarium reliquiarum Essendiensium of 12 July 1627, the earliest inventory of the Abbey's treasurym does not allow a certain identification, since it only recorded "Two crucifixes decorated with a lot of gemstones and gold, but gilded copper on the reverse." This description applies to all four of the processional crosses in the Essen Cathedral Treasury. The Liber Ordinarius, which controlled the liturgical use of the Abbey's treasure, speaks of processional crosses only in general terms. During the Thirty Years War, the Abbess fled with the treasure to Cologne and in 1794, as the French advanced on Essen, the Abbey Treasury was taken to Steele (modern Essen-Steele), where it was kept in an orphanage donated by the Abbess Francisca Christina of Sulzbach.

At secularisation the Catholic church of St Johann Baptist took over the Abbey as well as its property, as the parish church. It made the cross, along with the rest of the Cathedral treasury accessible to the public for the first time. During the Ruhr Uprising of 1920 the whole treasury was taken in great secrecy to Hildesheim, whence it was returned in 1925 in equally secretive circumstances.

In the Second World War the Cathedral Treasury was first taken to Warstein, then to Albrechtsburg in Meissen and thence to a bunker in Siegen. After the end of the war it was found there by American troops and the cross along with the rest of the treasury was taken to the State Museum in Marburg and later to a collection for displaced artworks in Schloss Dyck in Rheydt. From April to October 1949 the Essen Cathedral Treasury was displayed in Brussels and Amsterdam, before it was brought back to Essen.

With the creation of the Diocese of Essen in 1958 and the elevation of Essen Minster to the status of Cathedral, the cross became property of the diocese.

== Liturgical use ==
The details of the liturgical use of the crosses in Essen Abbey are not known. Though the sources, particularly the Essen Liber Ordinarius which dates to around 1400, describe the use of the processional crosses for processions, they speak of these crosses in general terms, without mentioning specific crosses. Although the diocese no longer uses the Cross of Mathilde in processions on conservation grounds, it is not a museum piece, but a religious object, which can be used in religious services. For instance, it was used as the altar cross on 5 November 2011 in a memorial service on the thousandth anniversary of Mathilde's death, for whose memory it was originally gifted.
