= Cross of Theophanu =

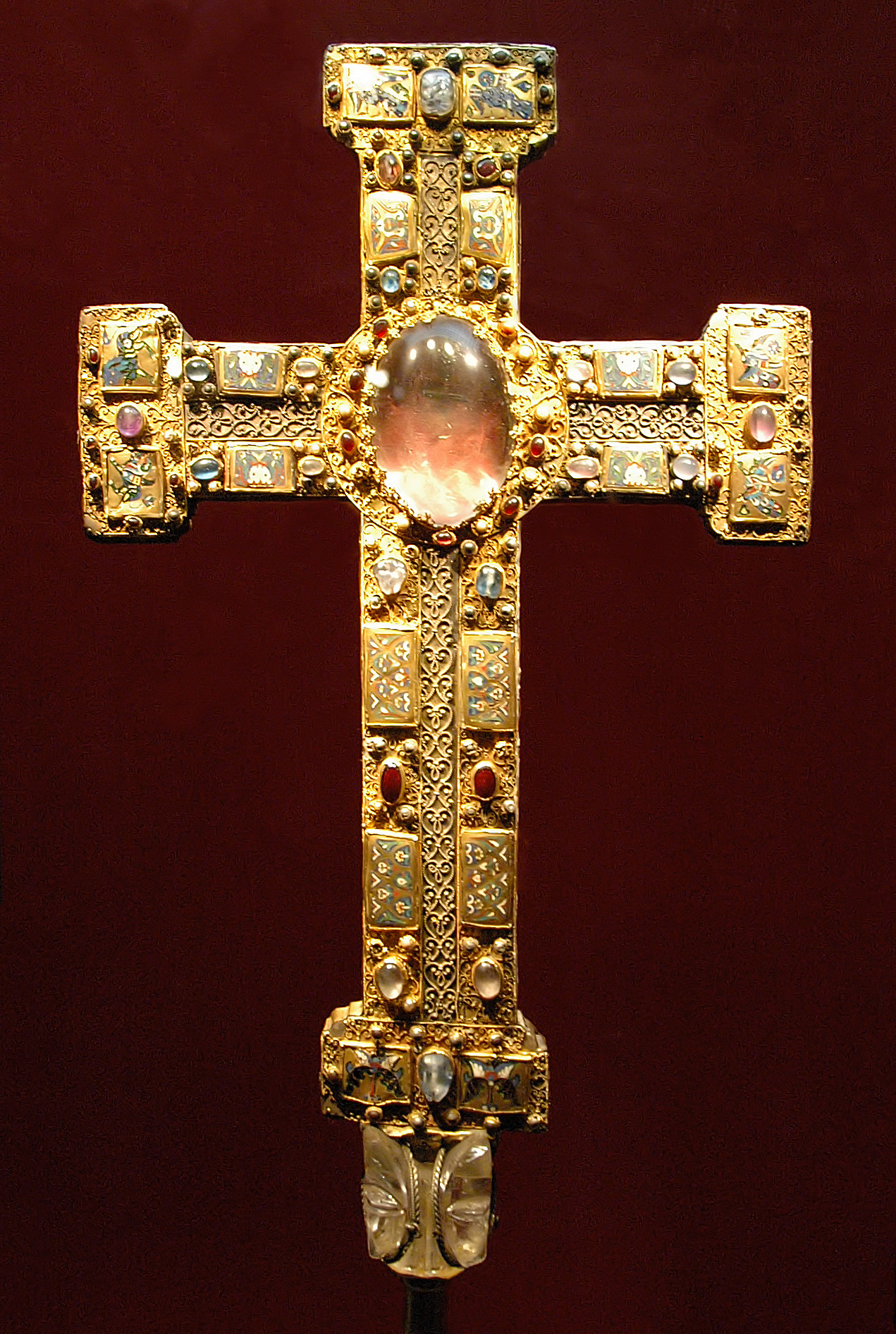
Cross of Theophanu, Essen Cathedral Treasury

The Cross of Theophanu (German: Theophanu-Kreuz) is one of four Ottonian processional crosses in the Essen Cathedral Treasury and is among the most significant pieces of goldwork from that period. It was donated by Theophanu, Abbess of Essen, who reigned from 1039 to 1058.

== Description ==
The basic form is that of a Latin cross with a lump of Egyptian quartz mounted at its centre, 44.5 cm high and 30 cm wide with a cedar core, decorated on both faces and the edges. On the edges there is an inscription, originally worked in gilt silver, but now largely lost, which identifies Theophanu as the Stifter (donor). From the fragments a portion, at least, of the text can be reconstructed: EDITA REGALE GENERE NOBILIS ABBATISSA THEOPHANU HOC SIGNUM DEDIT "Born of a royal family, noble Abbess Theophanu donated this standard".

The ends of the cross are formed by rectangular sections with rounded inner corners. At the centre on the front, there is a large, oval quartz crystal. Behind it there are two pieces of the True Cross on red velvet, enclosed as relics. The crystal is located on a round plate decorated with pearls, jewels and filigree work, which extends beyond the crossing and thereby enlarges the centre of the cross. Running along the edges of the cross are two bands made up of alternating enamel plates and gemstones (fastened with filigree). Between them there is a narrow central band of filigree work. At the ends of the cross there are two enamel plates decorated with gemstones, pearls and filigreework on either side of a gemstone. The eighteen enamel plates on the cross can be divided into three groups. The first group depicts stylised plants or animals whose natural models can only be found in the east (there are eight of these). The six plates on the stem and branches of the cross have a plaited pattern. The four enamels in the third group feature an interplay of the cloisonne and champleve methods, forming a fish scale pattern.

The back of the cross is covered by a gilt-copper plate, engraved with a bust of Christ Pantocrator in the centre and symbols of the Four evangelists at the ends.

== History ==
According to the fragmentary inscription, Theophanu was the donor of the cross. It was probably intended to be a counterpart to the Senkschmelz cross donated by her predecessor Mathilde. An exact date for the donation of the cross is not possible, but it might be connected with the consecration of the Minster's crypt in 1051 or the High altar in 1054.

At least eight but possibly up to fourteen of the eighteen enamel tablets are of Byzantine origin; The four tablets of the third group have been shown to have been made in the Empire. The enamel work seems ultimately to have been derived from older pieces, which were made available for the creation of the cross from a treasure fund in the possession of the donor - in a similar way to the gems. The Byzantine components of the Theophanu cross are probably derived from the possessions inherited by the Ezzonids from the Ottonian dynasty.

== See also ==
- Cross of Mathilde
- Cross of Otto and Mathilde
- Senkschmelz Cross

== Bibliography ==
- Georg Humann. Die Kunstwerke der Münsterkirche zu Essen. Düsseldorf 1904.
- Klaus Gereon Beuckers. Die Ezzonen und ihre Stiftungen. Eine Untersuchung zur Stiftungstätigkeit im 11. Jahrhundert (= Kunstgeschichte. Bd. 42). Lit Verlag, Münster/ Hamburg 1993, ISBN 3-89473-953-3 (= Diss. Bonn 1993).
- Alfred Pothmann. "Der Essener Kirchenschatz aus der Frühzeit der Stiftsgeschichte." In Herrschaft, Bildung und Gebet – Gründung und Anfänge des Frauenstifts Essen. Klartext Verlag, Essen 2000, ISBN 3-88474-907-2.
- Klaus Gereon Beuckers, Ulrich Knapp. Farbiges Gold – Die ottonischen Kreuze in der Domschatzkammer Essen und ihre Emails. Domschatzkammer Essen 2006, ISBN 3-00-020039-8.
