= Essen Cathedral Treasury =

Church treasury

Coordinates: 51°27′21″N 7°00′51″E

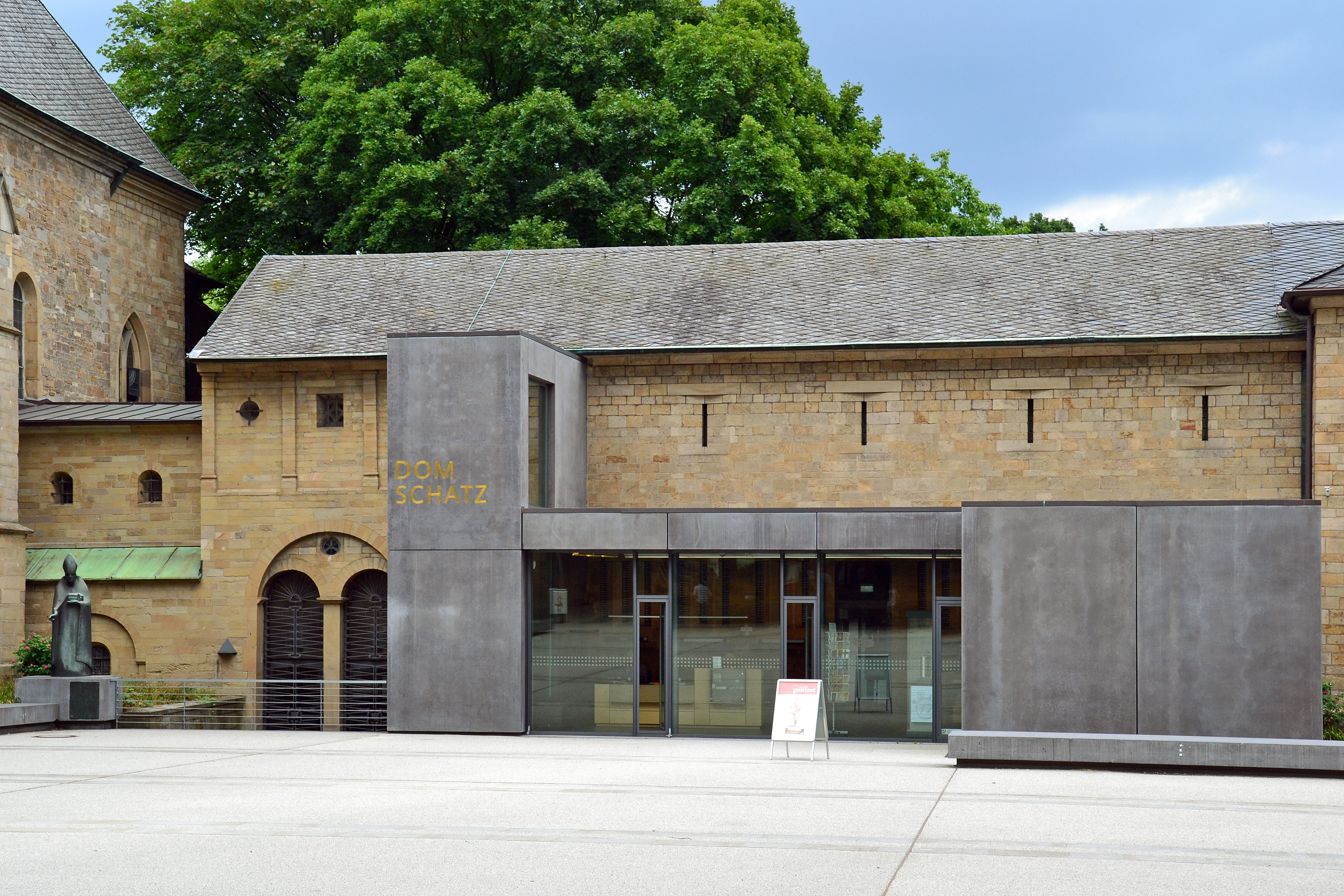
Essen Cathedral Treasury chamber next to Essen Minster

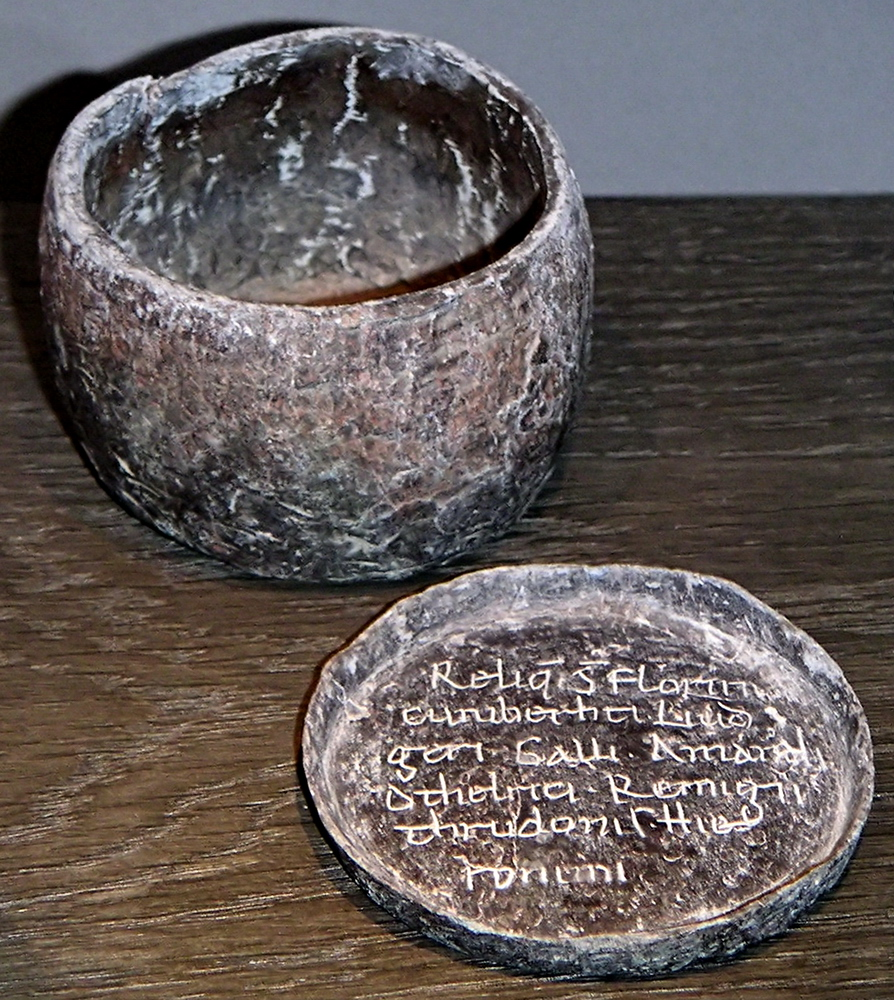
Reliquary from the abandoned altars of Ostchores in Essen Minster, dating from 1054.

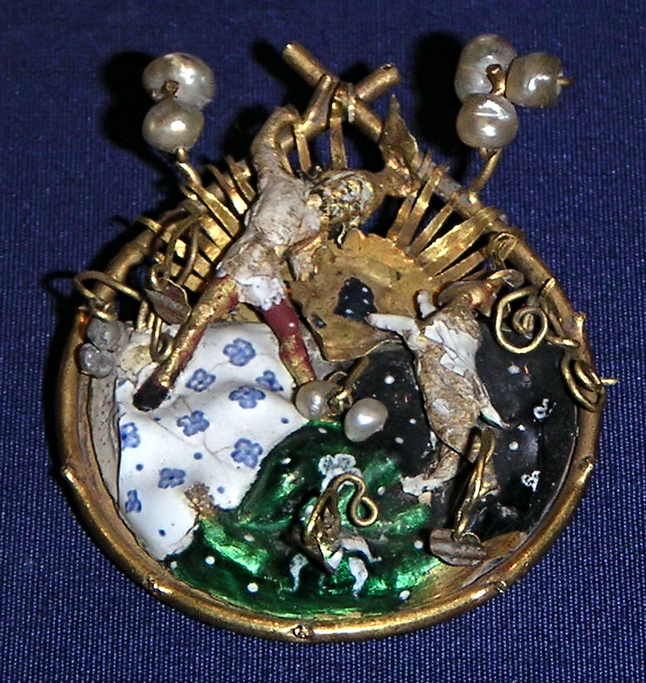
These Burgundian fibulae are a highlight of the treasury. In total, the treasury contains sixteen of these rare pieces of jewelry from the fourteenth century.

The Essen Cathedral Treasury (German: Essener Domschatz) is one of the most significant collections of religious artworks in Germany. A great number of items of treasure are accessible to the public in the treasury chamber of Essen Minster. The cathedral chapter manages the treasury chamber, not as a museum as in some places, but as the place in which liturgical implements and objects are kept, which continued to be used to this day in the service of God, so far as their conservation requirements allow.

== History ==
The Cathedral Treasury derives from the treasury of the former Canonesses of Essen, which passed to St Johann Baptist after the secularisation of the order in 1803.

During the Ruhr Uprising in 1920, the entire treasury was smuggled out to Hildesheim in secret, from which it was returned in 1925.

During the Second World War the Treasury was taken first to Warstein, then to Albrechtsburg in Meissen and from there to Siegen, where it was sealed in Hain tunnel to protect it from aerial bombing. After the end of the war it was found there by American troops and brought to the State Museum in Marburg, and later to a collection of displaced artworks in Schloss Dyck, Rheydt. From April to October 1949, the Essen Cathedral Treasury was displayed in Brussels and Amsterdam and after that it was brought back to Essen.

In 1953 the Treasure was displayed in an exhibition in the Villa Hügel. In 1957 the Treasure became the property of the then newly established Diocese of Essen. The Treasury Chamber was first made accessible to the public without charge in 1958 at the wish of the first Bishop of Essen, Franz Hengsbach.

The Treasury had to be closed from 15 September 2008 until 15 May 2009 for a structural extension. The Treasure was displayed as the opening exhibit of the Ruhr Museum in the former coal washery of the Zollverein Coal Mine Industrial Complex from 20 October 2008 until 8 February 2009 with the tagline Gold vor Schwarz (“Gold in Black”). The new display of the Cathedral Treasure was opened on 15 May 2009, which was over seventy percent larger than the previous space and improved in line with the latest ideas in museum education.

== Collection ==
The collection is exceptional in its completeness because only a few pieces of the Abbey's Treasure, such as the golden shrine of St Marsus, have been lost in the course of time, and particularly because the liber ordinarius survives, in which the liturgical use of the objects is laid out. The Essen Cathedral Treasury contains several artistically significant works, particularly from the Ottonian period, such as:

- Four processional crosses from Ottonian times: the Cross of Otto and Mathilde, the Senkshmelz Cross, the Cross of Theophanu and the Cross of Mathilde
- A golden crown, which is claimed to be the Childhood Crown of Otto III, but is generally dated to the eleventh century. It is, at any rate, the oldest surviving lily crown.
- The Sword of Saints Cosmas and Damian, the gold-sheathed ceremonial sword of the abbesses since Ottonian times
- The Theophanu Gospels, an eleventh-century manuscript with a gilt cover and carved ivory plate in the middle.
- A cross-shaped reliquary for a Holy Nail, gifted by Theophanu.
- The Golden Madonna, the oldest sculpture of Mary in western art (kept in the Minster).
- A two metre tall Seven-armed candelabrum from Ottonian times (kept in the Minster)

In addition to the Ottonian artworks, valuable objects from later times also belong to the Cathedral Treasury, such as the Bust of Marsus and sixteen Burgundian fibulae from the fourteenth century. Several manuscripts also belong to the Cathedral Treasury, including the Great Carolingian Gospels (Ms. 1) also known as Essen Cathedral Treasury Hs. 1 of linguistical and artistic significance, the Liber Ordinarius of Essen (Ms. 19), and the Necrology of Essen (Ms. 20).

There is also a vitrine in the Treasury with loaned items from the Diocesan Museum, such as the crosier, mitres, pectoral crosses and rings of the deceased Bishops of Essen.

== See also ==
- Aachen Cathedral Treasury
- Trier Cathedral Treasury
- Seven-branched candelabrum (Essen)

== Bibliography ==
- Georg Humann. Die Kunstwerke der Münsterkirche zu Essen. Schwann, Düsseldorf 1904.
- Heinz Köhn. Der Essener Münsterschatz. Eine Einführung, Essen 1953.
- Victor H. Elbern. Der Münsterschatz von Essen. Kühlen, Mönchengladbach 1959.
- Leonhard Küppers and Paul Mikat. Der Essener Münsterschatz. Fredebeul u. Koenen, Essen 1966.
- Alfred Pothmann. "Der Essener Kirchenschatz aus der Frühzeit der Stiftsgeschichte." In Günter Berghaus (ed.): Herrschaft, Bildung und Gebet. Gründung und Anfänge des Frauenstifts Essen. Klartext-Verlag, Essen 2000, ISBN 3-88474-907-2, pp. 135–153.
- Jan Gerschow. "Der Schatz des Essener Frauenstifts bis zum 15. Jahrhundert. Zur Geschichte der Institution." In Das Münster am Hellweg 56, 2003, pp. 79–110.
- Klaus Gereon Beuckers and Ulrich Knapp. Farbiges Gold. Die ottonischen Kreuze in der Domschatzkammer Essen und ihre Emails. Domschatzkammer Essen, Essen 2006, ISBN 3-00-020039-8.
- Birgitta Falk, Thomas Schilp, and Michael Schlagheck (edd.). ... wie das Gold den Augen leuchtet. Schätze aus dem Essener Frauenstift (= Essener Forschungen zum Frauenstift. Bd. 5). Klartext-Verlag, Essen 2007, ISBN 978-3-89861-786-4.
- Birgitta Falk (ed.). Gold vor Schwarz. Der Essener Domschatz auf Zollverein. Catalogue of the exhibition in the Ruhr Museum, Essen (20 October 2008 - 11 January 2009). Klartext-Verlag, Essen 2008, ISBN 978-3-8375-0050-9.
- Birgitta Falk (ed.). Der Essener Domschatz. Klartext Verlag, Essen 2009, ISBN 978-3-8375-0200-8.
- Ina Germes-Dohmen. "Nach Umbau und Erweiterung. Der Essener Domschatz präsentiert sich mit neuem Konzept und Design." In Das Münster am Hellweg 62, 2009, pp. 150–155.
