= Swanhild =

Swanhild, Suanhild or Svanhild may refer to:

== Historical ==
- Swanachild, Bavarian princess who became the wife of Charles Martel (c. 688–741)
- Swanhild, wife or concubine of King Harald Fairhair of Norway (c. 850–933)
- Swanehilde of Saxony (c. 945–1014), daughter of Hermann Billung, Margrave of Saxony, and wife of Thietmar and Eckard I, Margraves of Meissen
- Swanhild, abbess of Herford Abbey in Saxony (c. 1051–1076)
- Swanhilda of Eguisheim (c. 1025–1050), ancestor of many European royal families
- Swanhilde of Ungarnmark (d. 1120), Austrian royal consort
- Suanhild of Essen (died 1185), abbess
- Svanhild Sponberg (fl. 1965–1973), Norwegian handball player

== Arts and literature ==
- Svanhildr, daughter of Sigurd and Gudrun in northern European mythology
- Swanhild, a character in Henrik Ibsen's play Love's Comedy (1862)
- Swanilda/Swanhilde, the heroine of the ballet Coppélia (1870)
- Swanhild, a character in H. Rider Haggard's book Eric Brighteyes (1890)
- Swanhilde, a character in César Franck's opera Hulda (1894)
