= Sedes Sapientiae, Leuven =

Medieval wooden statue of the Virgin Mary

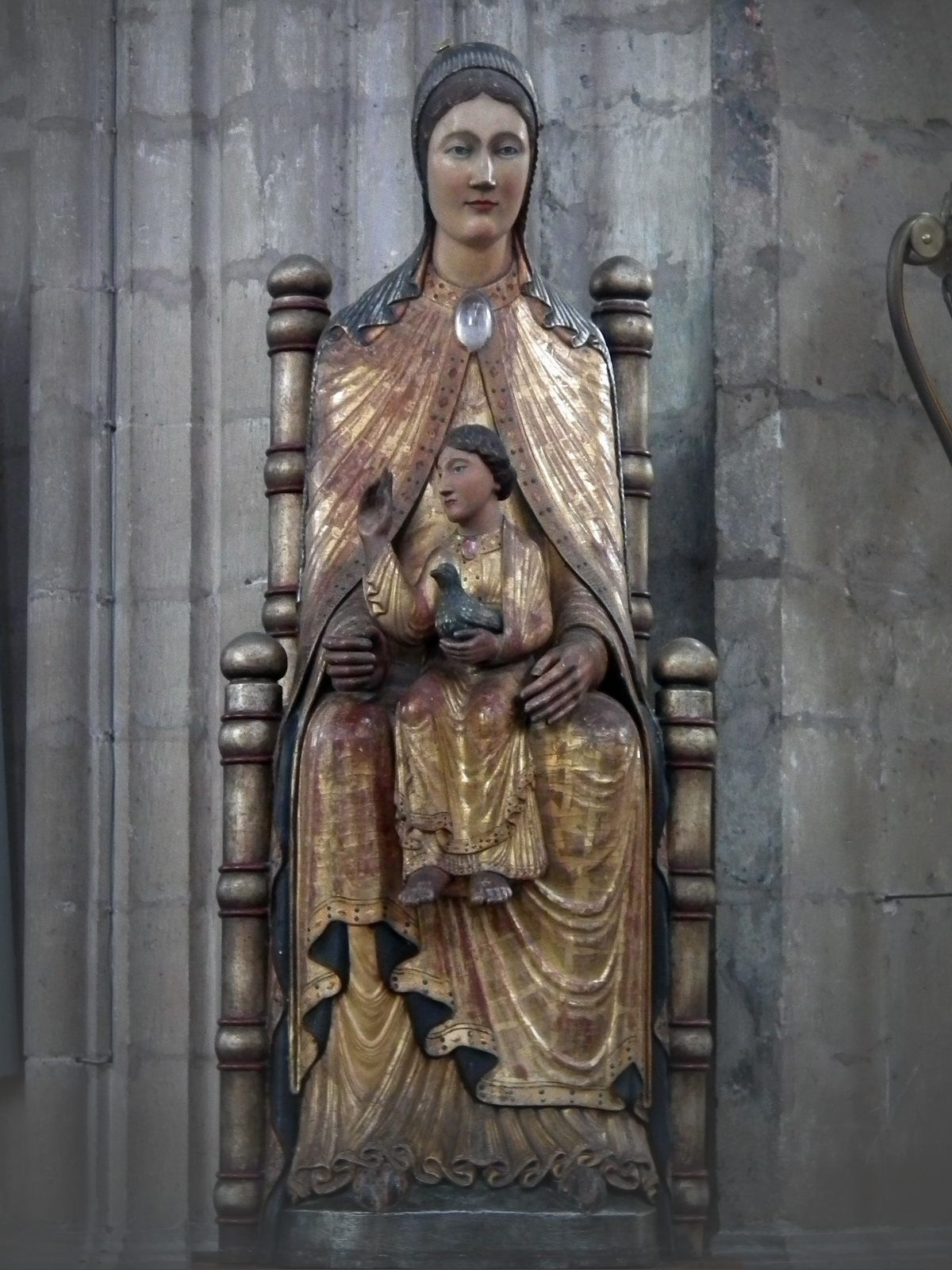

The Sedes Sapientiae (Latin for "Seat of Wisdom", one of the medieval titles of the Virgin), also known as Our Lady of Leuven, is a medieval wooden statue of the Virgin Mary located at St Peter's Church in Leuven, Belgium. It was carved in 1442 by Nicolaas De Bruyne as an enlarged copy of an earlier statue from the 13th century. The polychromy was done by Roelof van Velpen. It was restored in 1842 and 1945. A longstanding local landmark, the statue was depicted on the seals of the Katholieke Universiteit Leuven and UCLouvain.

== Veneration of the statue ==
The veneration and popularity of the Sedes Sapientiae is evident, among other things, from the fact that the magistrate of Leuven regularly intervened in the costs of renewing the mantle made from gold leaf. People came from throughout Europe to venerate her. There are traditions that tell of high-ranking figures such as: Isabella of Portugal, wife of the Duke of Burgundy, Philip the Good, and Margaret of York coming to venerate the statue. During exam sessions, it is common for students from the university of Leuven to light candles and place them in front of the statue.

== Damage and restoration ==
The Sedes Sapientiae was severely damaged during the bombing of Leuven in 1944 during World War II. The collapse of the marble altar led to the statue falling down and fragmenting. Several large pieces of the Sedes Sapientiae were found amidst the rubble and were put back together again. Only three fingers from Baby Jesus and a small piece of the mantle had to be remade. The only change to the image was the removal of a hair curl on the child's temples and the replacement of the Gothic consoles on the pillars of the seat with spherical ends.
