= Seat of Wisdom =

Devotional title for Mary

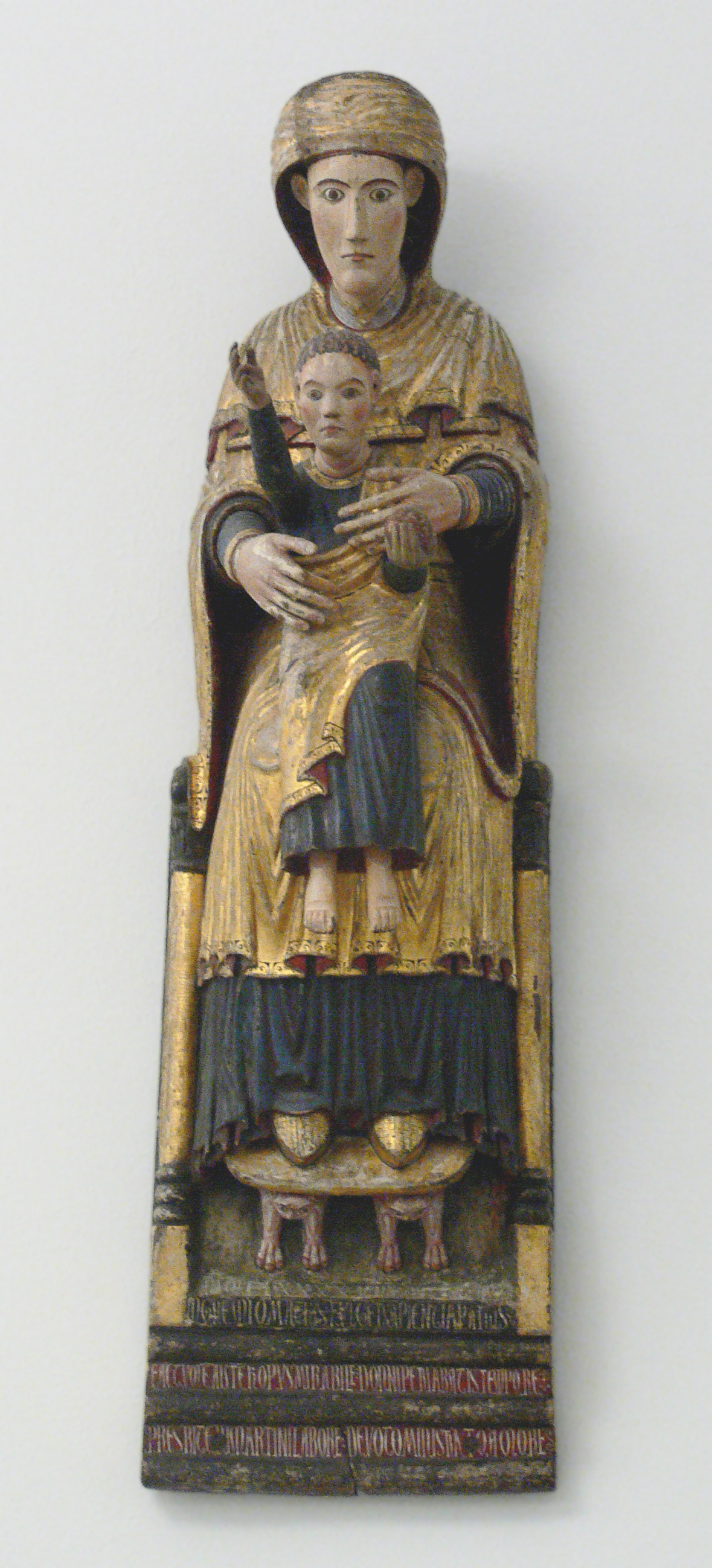
A 12th century statue in Sansepolcro Cathedral, Italy

Seat of Wisdom or Throne of Wisdom (Latin: sedes sapientiae) is one of many devotional titles for Mary in Roman Catholic tradition. In Seat of Wisdom icons and sculptures, Mary is seated on a throne with the Christ Child on her lap. For the more domestic and intimate iconic representations of Mary with the infant Jesus on her lap, see Madonna and Child. The Roman Catholic Church honors Mary, Seat of Wisdom, with a feast day on June 8.

The title and the imagery associated with it are occasionally also found in Protestant tradition; for example Merton College, Oxford commissioned a statue of "Our Lady, Seat of Wisdom" for its chapel in 2014.

== History ==
The invocation, "Seat of Wisdom", originated in the eleventh century. Many early Christians saw Christ as Wisdom incarnate; therefore, by holding him on her lap, Mary becomes the "seat" of wisdom. It later became part of the Litany of Loreto.

== In art ==
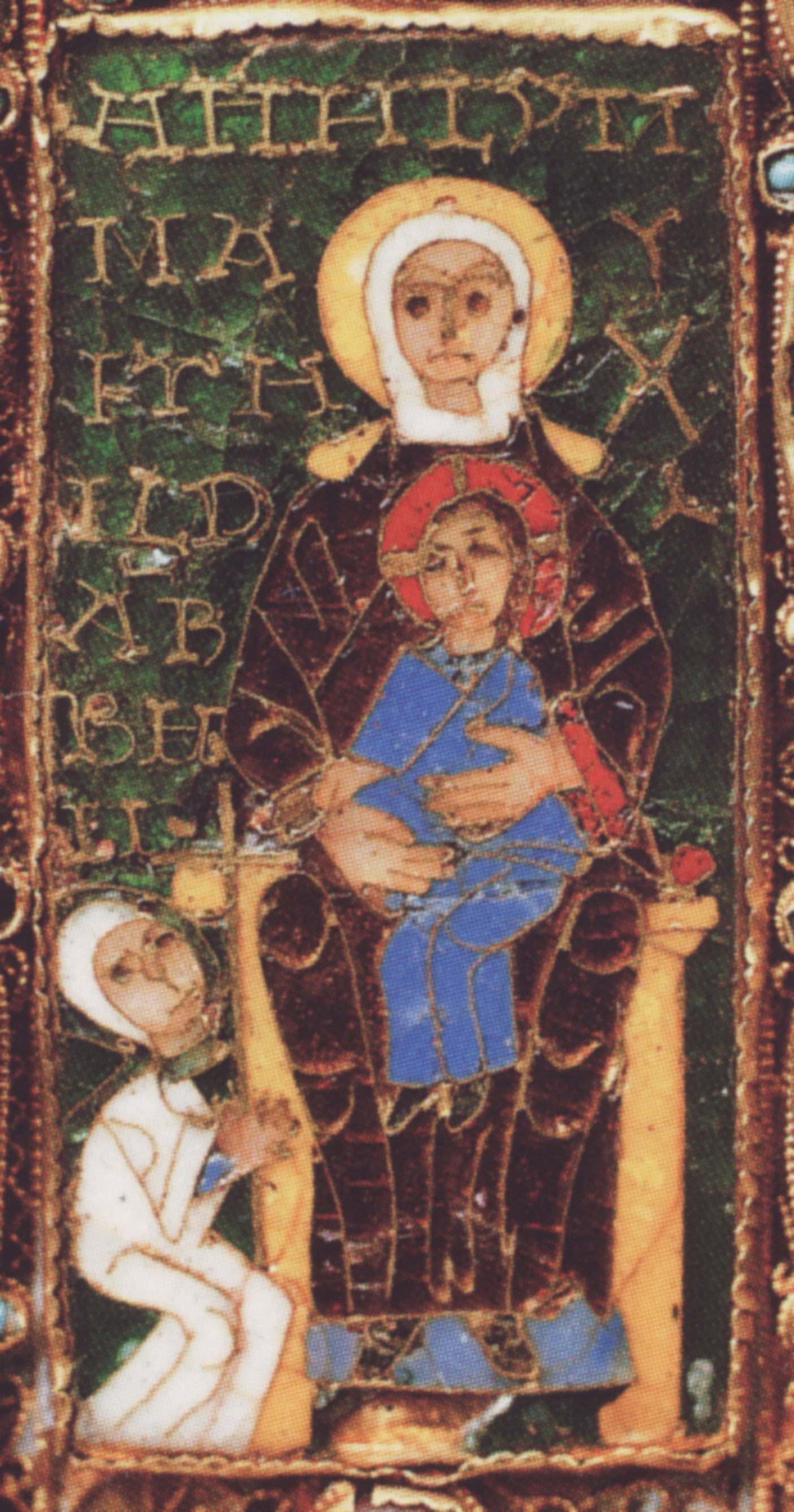
An enamel plaque on the processional Cross of Mathilde, showing an image of the donor together with Mary, Seat of Wisdom

This type of Madonna image is based on the Byzantine prototype of the Chora tou Achoretou ("Container of the Uncontainable"), an epithet mentioned in the Acathist Hymn and present in the Greek East by the early 11th century, when the Byzantine-inspired enamels were made in Germany for the Cross of Mathilde. The type appeared in a wide range of sculptural and, later, painted images in Western Europe, especially around 1200. In these representations, some structural elements of the throne invariably appear, even if only handholds and front legs. The Virgin's feet often rest on a low stool. Later, Gothic sculptures of the type are more explicitly identifiable with the Throne of Solomon, where: "...two lions stood, one at each hand. And twelve little lions stood upon the six steps on the one side and on the other."(I Kings 10: 18–20)

The Sedes sapientiae icon also appeared in illuminated manuscripts and Romanesque frescoes and mosaics, and was represented on seals. The icon possesses in addition emblematic verbal components: the Virgin as the Throne of Wisdom is a trope of Damiani or Guibert de Nogent, based on their typological interpretation of the passage in the Books of Kings, that describes the throne of Solomon (I Kings 10: 18–20, repeated at II Chronicles 9: 17–19). This was much used in Early Netherlandish painting in works like the Lucca Madonna by Jan van Eyck.

== Other uses ==
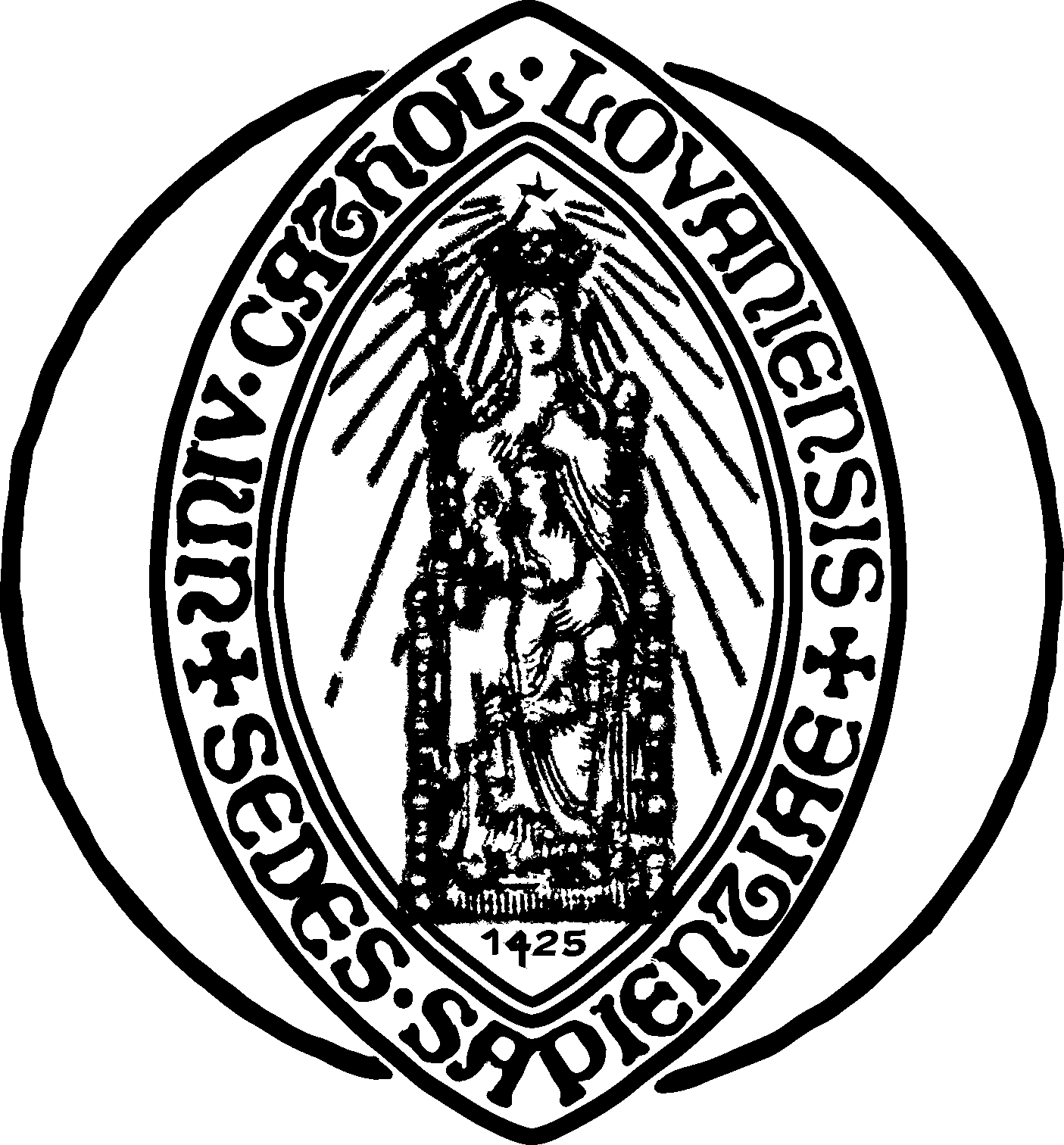
Seal of the unitary Catholic University of Louvain

In modern times, sedes sapientiae is on the seal of the Catholic University of Leuven (here a play on words, since the university itself is a major seat of learning in the Low Countries). The Newman University Church in Dublin, Ireland is dedicated to Our Lady Seat of Wisdom. In 1999, Notre Dame College in Dhaka created a collage of Mata Mary (Mother Mary, Bengali: মাতা মেরি; the common name in which the college is known as) where Mary is shown as the Seat of Wisdom. Our Lady Seat of Wisdom College is in Ontario.

== See also ==
- Sedes Sapientiae, Leuven
- Maestà, Maria Regina.
- Madonna of humility
- Our Lady Seat of Wisdom College
- Church of Our Lady Seat of Wisdom, Dublin
- Sophia (wisdom)
- Holy Wisdom
