= Essen cross with large enamels =

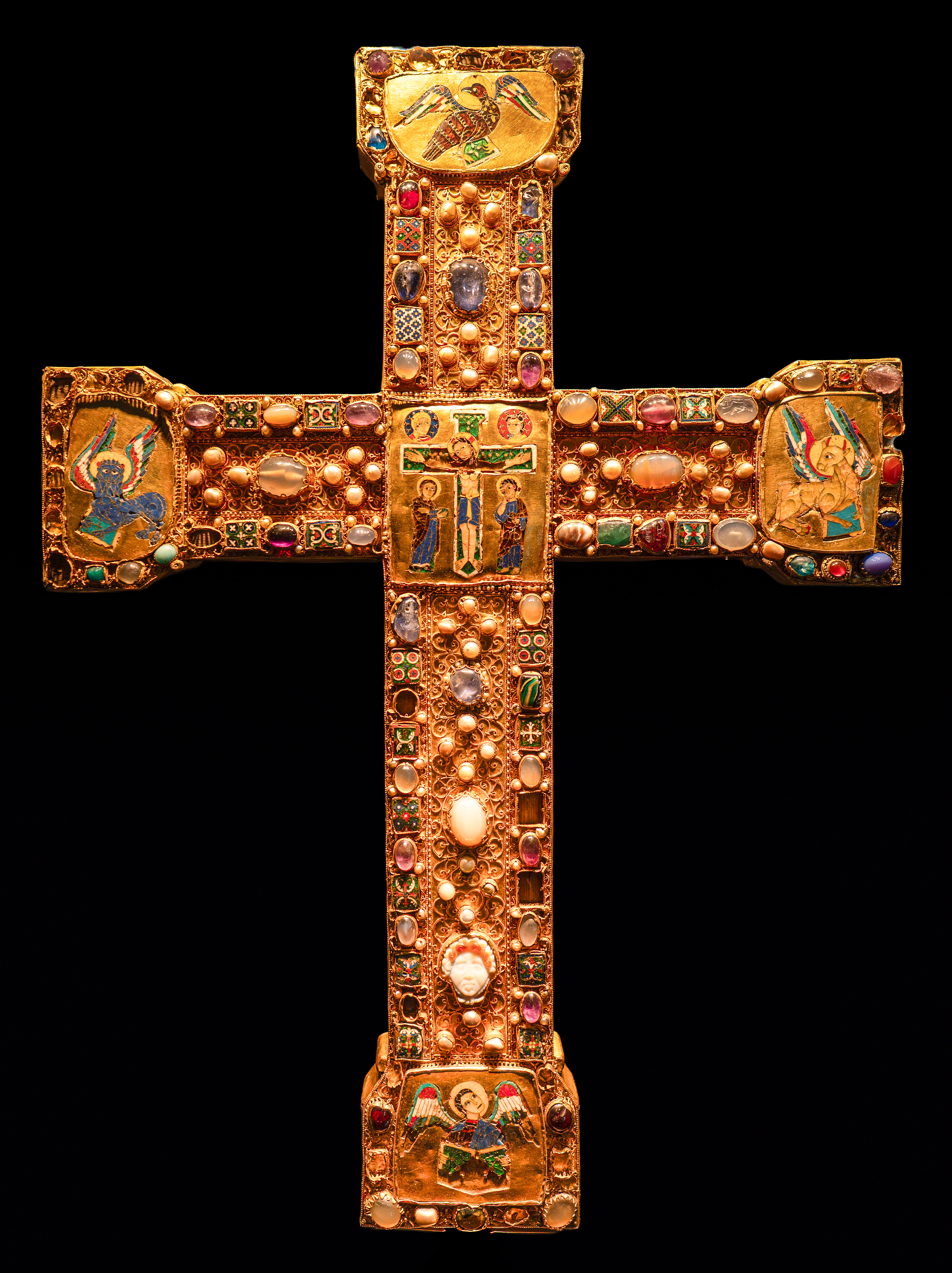
The Senkschmelzen Cross in the exhibition Gold vor Schwarz (Gold on Black)

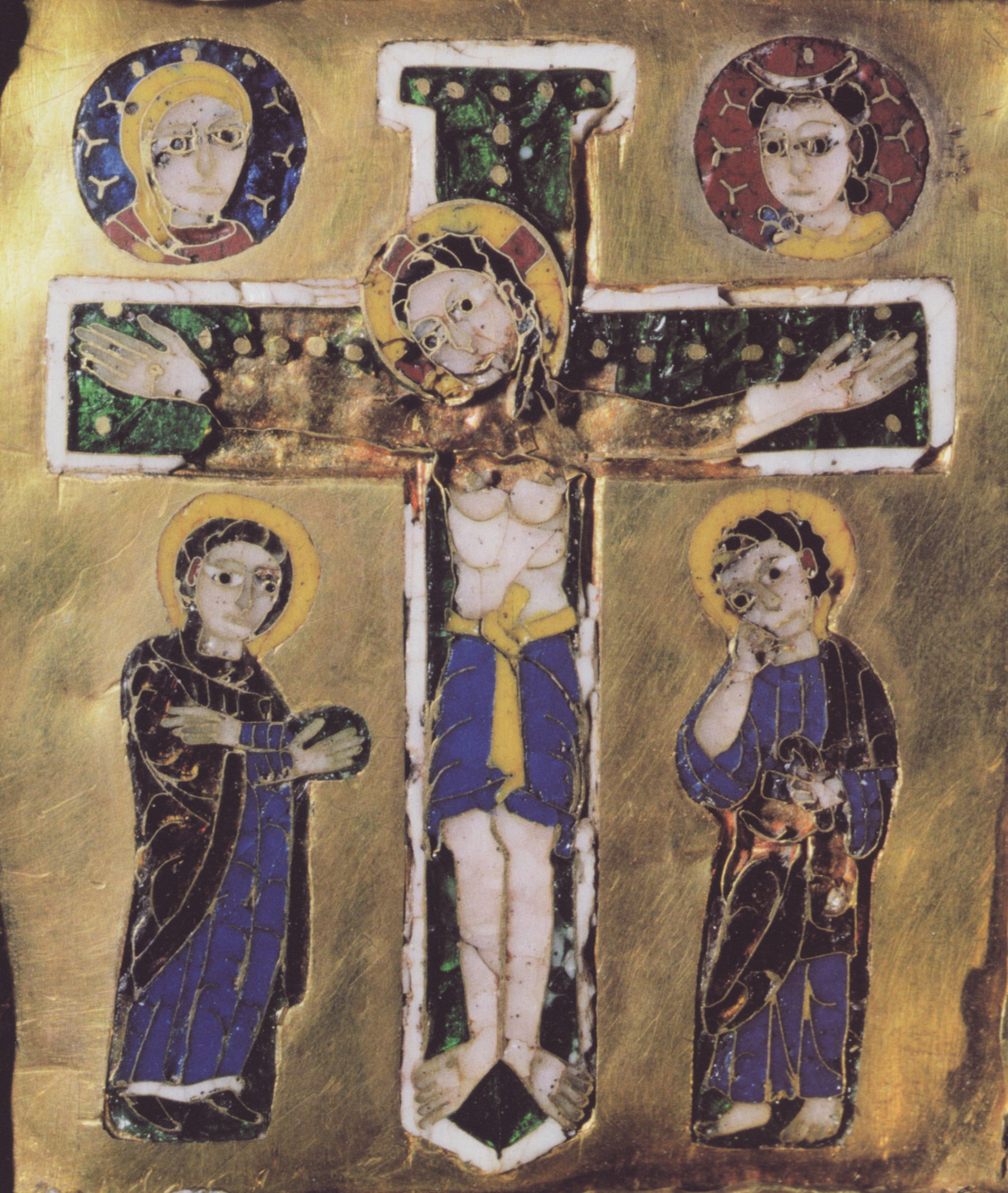
The Cross' enamel of the crucifixion (actual size 7.8x6.5 cm)

The Cross with large enamels, or Senkschmelz Cross, known in German as the Senkschmelzen-Kreuz or the Kreuz mit den großen Senkschmelzen (Cross with large senkschmelz enamels), is a processional cross in the Essen Cathedral Treasury which was created under Mathilde, Abbess of Essen. The name refers to its principal decorations, five unusually large enamel plaques made using the senkschmelz technique, a form of cloisonné which looks forward to champlevé enamel, with a recessed area in enamel surrounded by a plain gold background, and distinguishes it from three other crosses of the crux gemmata type at Essen. The cross is considered one of the masterpieces of Ottonian goldsmithing.

== Description ==
The original part of the cross is 46 cm high and 33 cm wide, with a core made of oak excluding the later fitting at the base. It is a Latin cross with block-shaped ends. These appear similar to the cubic capitals which were popular in architecture around the year 1000. The front of the cross is covered with a highly decorated gold sheet, the back, with one of gilded copper, later in date, which is engraved and partly decorated in relief. The cross is a pure crux gemmata, in which the senkshmelz plaque at the centre shows the Crucifixion of Jesus. The Cross with large enamels is closely related to three other processional crosses in Essen, two of which, the Cross of Otto and Mathilde and the Cross of Mathilde were also donated by Abbess Mathilde. Just like the oldest of these, the Cross of Otto and Mathilde, it has an internal cross, surrounded by a border. While the border of the older cross is composed of gemstones each accompanied by two pearls, the border of the Cross with large enamels also included 24 small enamels (of which 21 still survive), which alternate with gemstones each accompanied by four pearls. The area of the Cross with large enamels inside the border is decorated with skilfully doubled filigree, gemstones, pearls arranged in the shape of crosses and an ancient cameo. On the cameo is a head of Medusa, technically referred to as a Gorgoneion. It is sardonyx and was made in the first half of the first century AD. The cameo is worked in three layers (grey-brown, white, and gold-brown) and has a maximum diameter of 2.7 cm. The cameo might be taken in reference to Psalm 91.13 as symbolic of evil's defeat by the saviour.

The name of the cross derives from the five large pieces of senkschmelz enamel at the extremities of the members, and in the crossing. In the centre of the Cross there is a slightly oblong plaque with a depiction of the crucifixion: Christ is on the cross with his head inclined to the left and his eyes wide open. Mary and John (identified on the basis of his contemplative gesture) stand on either side. Above the horizontal arms of the Cross, personifications of the Sun and Moon watch the events. The enamel is surrounded by tiny pearls and due to its size it extends a little above and below the horizontal arm of the cross.

At the ends of the members of the cross, inside a simplified border of gemstones, which matches the border of the cross' arms, four further large, irregularly shaped senkschmelz panels are found with the symbols of the Four Evangelists: at top the eagle of John, at bottom the winged man of Matthew, at right the winged bull of Luke and at left the winged lion of Mark. These large senkschmelz panels are unusually large for European work (as opposed to Byzantine) and of high technical and artistic quality, which is visible in the rich colours and fine delineation of the wings.

The back plate of the Cross was replaced in the twelfth century and depicts the Tree of Life. In the expanded space at the ends of the cross there are four chased medallions depicting angels and in the centre there is a medallion depicting the Agnus Dei.

== Creation and remodelling ==
The Cross is universally dated to around 1000 by scholars. This dating is based firstly on the motifs of the 21 small enamels of the border, which bear floral and carpet-like patterns, which arose around the turn of the millennium, and secondly on the framing of the stones and border enamels which seems to derive from the Cross of Otto and Mathilde (dated to around 982).

The irregular form of the Evangelist plaques is conspicuous, as is the fact that the central plaque does not fit neatly to its position. These plaques were created around 1000. However, on the grounds of their similarly irregular shape, these plaques were probably created for another context and later incorporated into the Cross, which was considerably altered as a result. For this purpose, the plaques of the Evangelists, whose composition betrays Byzantine influence, were recut. Therefore, their irregular shape stressed the fact that they were spolia. In order to fit these plaques, the original border of the ends and centre of the Cross was simplified to the current form.

Beuckers dated this remodelling to the time of Abbess Sophia. In this remodelling, the collars of the ends of the cross became pointless and the goldsmith responsible for the remodelling concealed them with spiral-shaped filigree wire, known as Bienenkörbe (beehives). This ornamental motif came into vogue in the reign of Henry II (r. 1014–1024), along with another type of filigree decoration, the Blütenkronen (corollae) which also appears on the ends of this cross (uniquely among the pieces in the Essen Cathedral Treasury). Sophia had been appointed Abbess of Essen by Henry II and was close to him, which might have given her the opportunity to employ one of his goldsmiths. Neither Bienenkörbe nor Blütenkronen appear on the treasures which Sophia's successor Theophanu had made (presumably at another workshop), so Beuckers excludes her as the person responsible for the creation of the Cross with large enamels. It is not known why Sophia had a sacral object which had been created by her predecessor Mathilde remodelled and had another, apparently significant artwork of her own incorporated into it.

If this dating is accepted, then the Cross with large enamels was created at the same time as the reliquary later known as the Marsus shrine. This artwork, considered the most significant treasure of the Abbey was a memorial donation of Emperor Otto III (r. 996–1002) for his father Otto II and was therefore very ornate. The shrine went missing in 1794 and no images of it are preserved. Beuckers assumes that the Cross and the Shrine, which was decorated with golden enamel plaques, were created in a workshop which was located in Essen. Since the border enamels of the Cross incorporate motifs found in work attributed to the Trier workshop, and the Marsus Shrine was created after 997, Beuckers suggests that Abbess Mathilde moved the workshop established in Trier by Archbishop Egbert of Trier to Essen after Egbert's death in 993, following which there are no signs of continuing activity in Trier. The Trier workshop is the only firmly locatable Ottonian enamel workshop. If the cross was indeed produced by the same workshop, this allows conclusions to be drawn about the quality of the lost Marsus shrine.

== History ==
From its creation, the cross has been located in Essen, except for evacuations during wars and other crises. Because of the similarities with the two other crosses of the Cathedral Treasury, which show Mathilde and were also donations to Essen, it is assumed that it belonged to the Abbey continuously from its donation until the secularisation of Essen Abbey in 1802. However, the surviving records from the abbey, later cathedral, do not explicitly mention the cross. The Inventarium reliquiarum Essendiensium of 12 July 1627, the earliest inventory of the Abbey's treasury does not allow a certain identification, since it only recorded "Two crucifixes richly decorated with gemstones and gold, but gilded copper on the reverse." This description applies to all four of the processional crosses in the Essen Cathedral Treasury. The Liber Ordinarius, which controlled the liturgical use of the Abbey's treasure, speaks of processional crosses only in general terms. During the Thirty Years War, the Abbess fled with the treasure to Cologne and in 1794, as the French advanced on Essen, the Abbey Treasury was taken to Steele (modern Essen-Steele), where it was kept in an orphanage donated by Abbess Francisca Christina of Sulzbach.

At secularisation the Catholic Church of St John Baptist took over the Abbey as well as its property, as the parish church. It made the cross, along with the rest of the Cathedral treasury accessible to the public for the first time. During the Ruhr Uprising of 1920 the whole treasury was taken in great secrecy to Hildesheim, whence it was returned in 1925 in equally secretive circumstances.

In the Second World War the Cathedral Treasury was first taken to Warstein, then to Albrechtsburg in Meissen and thence to a bunker in Siegen. After the end of the war it was found there by American troops and the cross along with the rest of the treasury was taken to the State Museum in Marburg and later to a collection for displaced artworks in Schloss Dyck in Rheydt. From April to October 1949 the Essen Cathedral Treasury was displayed in Brussels and Amsterdam, before it was brought back to Essen.

With the creation of the Diocese of Essen in 1958 and the elevation of Essen Minster to the status of Cathedral, the cross became property of the diocese.

== Liturgical use ==
Details of the original liturgical use of the Cross are not known. When the sources, most importantly the Essen Liber Ordinarius of 1400, describe the use of processional crosses for processions, they speak generally and without distinguished individual crosses. Processional crosses were often used in pairs and on the basis of the creation of the Cross with large enamels under Abbess Mathilde it is assumed that the Cross with large enamels was made as a companion to the Cross of Otto and Mathilde. The two crosses were used together under Cardinal Hengsbach. The Cross with large enamels was last used in 1992 at the funeral of the second Bishop of Essen, Dr. Hubert Luthe. Today the Cross with large enamels, like the other three Ottonian processional crosses of the cathedral, is no longer in use for conservation reasons.
