= Theophanu, Abbess of Essen =

Abbess of Essen Abbey from 1039 to 1058

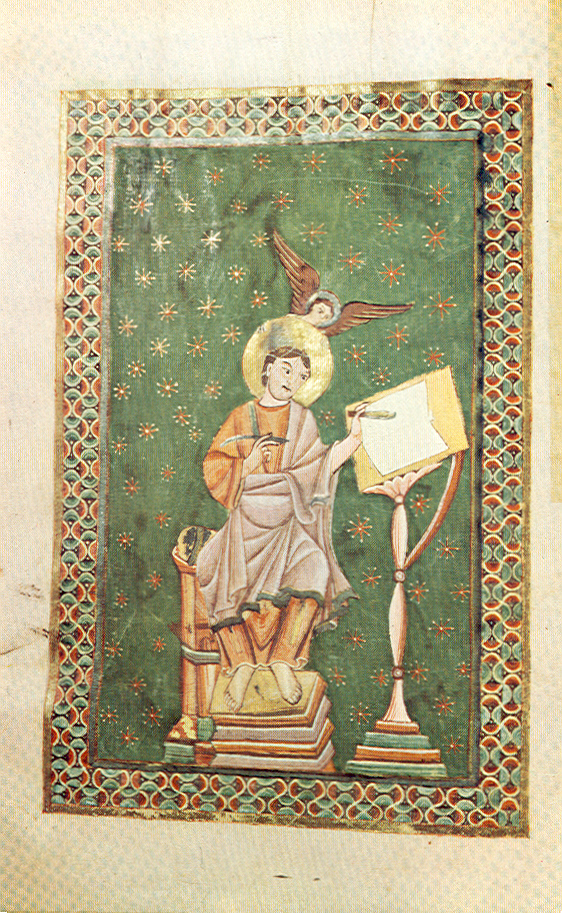
St Matthew from the Theophanu Gospels (fol. 10v)

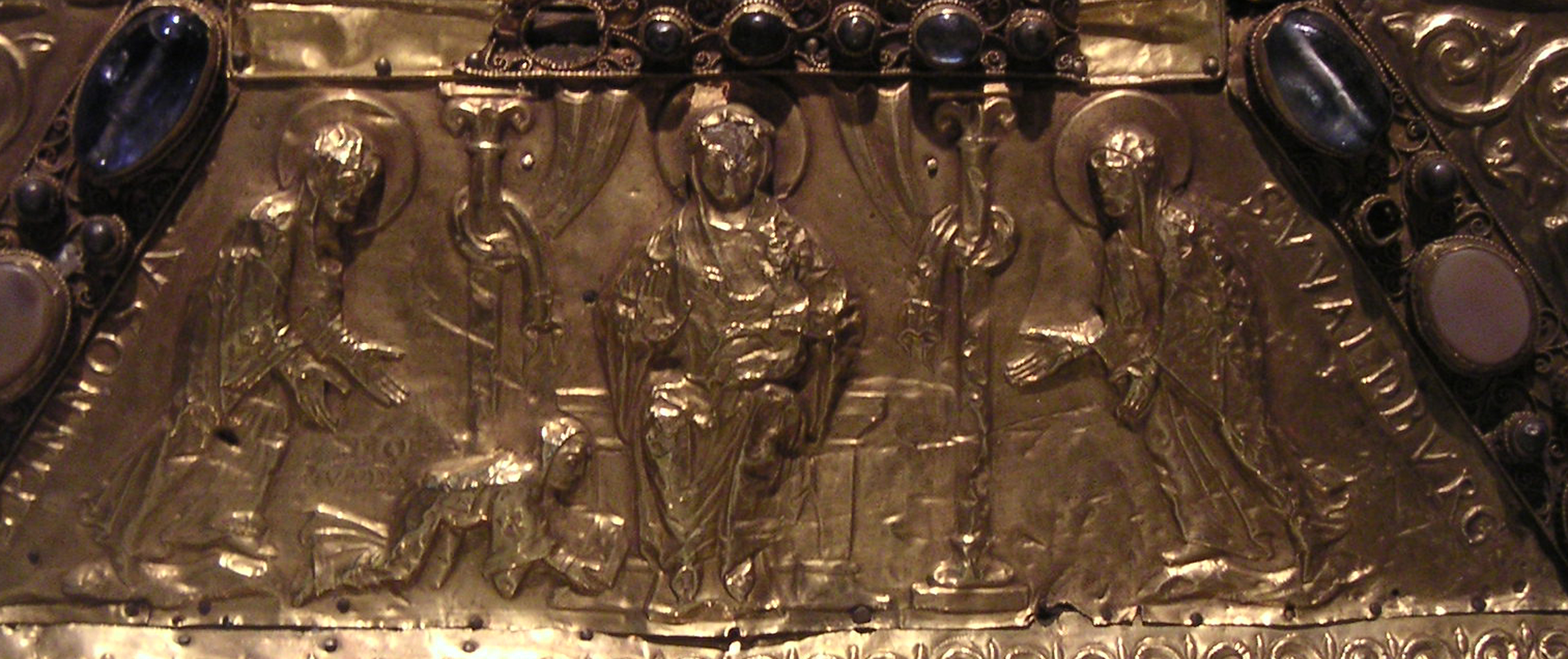
The cover of the Gospels donated by Theophanu: Theophanu offers the Gospels while kneeling at Mary's feet

Theophanu (c. 997 - 5 March 1058) was abbess of Essen Abbey from 1039 until her death in 1058. She donated many important objects to the abbey, expanded the cathedral in Essen, and assisted the town in securing the rights to hold markets from Emperor Henry III.

== Biography ==
Theophanu was born to the count palatine Ezzo of Lotharingia and his wife Matilda of Germany, through her being also a granddaughter of the Byzantine princess Theophanu and the Holy Roman Emperor Otto II. In this manner Theophanu belonged to both the Ezzonid and the Ottonian dynasties.

It is not known where Theophanu spent her childhood, and she is referred to for the first time in a document of 1037. But since she succeeded her aunt Sophia as abbess of Essen in 1039, it is possible that she was resident in the convent prior to this point. Theophanu also served as Abbess of Gerresheim, but the exact dates of her tenure there are unclear.

== Abbess of Essen ==
During her abbacy, Theophanu was responsible for a number of artistic and architectural commissions, including the renovation of the west end of Münster church to reflect the design of the famous octagonal Aachen Chapel. She donated several lavish illuminated manuscripts, including the Theophanu Gospels (now in the Essen Cathedral Treasury) and the Cross of Theophanu.

=== Theophanu Gospels ===
The copy of the Gospels that Theophanu commissioned for Essen Abbey - now Essen Cathedral Treasury Hs. 3 - has almost the same dimensions as a Carolingian Gospel book that can also be found today in Essen Cathedral Treasury, and may indeed have been intended to replace it. It is copied on parchment, measures 35.5cm x 25cm, and comprises 157 folios arranged in 21 gatherings. The text was written by a single scribe in Carolingian minuscule, likely in Essen, with each folio arranged in a single column of a maximum of 27 lines. The manuscript is richly illustrated with initials as well as portraits of the Evangelists, which were likely based on earlier examples from what is now Northern France and Belgium. Its connection to Theophanu is shown by the inscription THEOPHANU ABBA[tissa] on its ornate cover, which is now kept separately in Essen Cathedral Treasury.
