= Sophia I, Abbess of Gandersheim =

Abbess of Gandersheim from 1002 to 1039

Sophia I
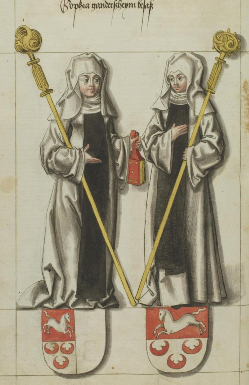
- Adelaide of Quedlinburg and Sophia of Gandersheim, by Lucas Cranach (1546)

Abbess of Gandersheim
- Reign: 1002–1039
- Predecessor: Gerberga II
- Successor: Adelaide II

Abbess of Essen
- Reign: 1011–1039
- Predecessor: Mathilde
- Successor: Theophanu
- Born: September 975(?)
- Died: 30 January 1039; Gandersheim Abbey, Saxony
- Burial: Gandersheim Abbey
- Dynasty: Ottonian
- Father: Otto II, Holy Roman Emperor
- Mother: Empress Theophanu
- Religion: Roman Catholic

Sophia I (September 975 – 30 January 1039), a member of the royal Ottonian dynasty, was Abbess of Gandersheim from 1002, and from 1011 also Abbess of Essen. The daughter of Emperor Otto II and his consort Theophanu, she was an important kingmaker in medieval Germany.

== Early life ==
According to the chronicles by Thietmar of Merseburg, Sophia was born to Emperor Otto II and Theophanu. She may have been the first surviving daughter, born in 975, though other sources indicate that her sister Adelaide, born 977, was in fact the eldest. Sophia is first documented in a 979 deed of donation, when her father entrusted her education to his first cousin, Abbess Gerberga II of Gandersheim. Sophia was raised and educated in Gandersheim Abbey to become abbess from childhood. Sophia being placed to take over Gandersheim abbey is significant as the abbey held a place of importance to the Ottonian dynasty. The abbey was founded by Duke Liudolf of Saxony, the oldest member of the Ottonian lineage, and was the site where many members of the family were laid to rest. The Abbey's significance to the dynasty likely also helped keep peace between the often opposed Ottonian and Henrican lines of the Liudolfings, with Duke Henry the Quarrelsome, son of Henry of Bavaria who threatened the rule of his brother Otto I and father of Emperor Henry II, dying and being buried at the abbey while Sophia was a canoness there in 995. Abbess Gerberga taught her convent discipline and common law, both of which she mastered. Sophia received many grants of rights and property from her father as well as from her brother, Otto III, who succeeded as King of the Romans in 983.

Sophia took the vows to become a canoness in 989. The contemporary chronicler Thangmar, in his Vita Bernwardi (Life of Saint Bernward), records several incidents in which Sophia exercised her influence in the abbey to influence a dispute between the Bishops of Mainz and Hildesheim over their jurisdictions. Thangmar is often criticized as being an unreliable and biased source with authorship of portions of the Vita Bernwardi being brought into question by some scholars. This was a significant dispute at the time as bishops exercised a considerable amount of political influence during the Ottonian Dynasty. As an emperor's daughter, Sophia insisted that she take the veil from Archbishop Willigis of Mainz, the archchancellor of the Holy Roman Empire, affronting the local Bishop Osdag of Hildesheim. Archbishop Willigis was very close to Otto III as he was one of the few members of clergy that supported Otto III during an attempted coup by Henry the Quarreler in 983. It is likely that Theophanu saw the veiling of Sophia as an opportunity for Willigis to show authority over Gandersheim as reward for his support during the coup attempt. This led to Osdag moving his episcopal throne from Hildesheim to the altar at Gandersheim. This led to a public argument between Osdag and Willigis before an assembly of canonesses as well as the Emperor Otto III and Theophanu. The two later agreed to veil Sophia together as long as Osdag retained the right to veil all other canonesses at the abbey.

Thangmar claimed that on several occasions when Bishop Bernward visited Gandersheim, that Sophia had convinced the canonesses of the abbey to receive him coldly rather than to give him a proper welcome. On one instance when Bernward came to consecrate a new church in 1000, he was met with an angry mob and upon successfully making his way into the church to begin mass, the canonesses reportedly cursed him and threw their offerings on the ground in front of Bernward rather than to present them to him in a respectful manner. In another instance, according to Thangmar, after returning from a meeting with Pope Sylvester II in which Bernward was granted authority over Gandersheim in 1001, the Bishop was kept from entering the church by a group of soldiers assembled by Sophia, who had taken defensive positions around the church. Bernward returned and consecrated the Abbey in 1007 with the support of Emperor Henry II, but in 1021 when Aribo became the new Archbishop of Mainz, Sophia asked of him to question Bernward's authority and again return Gandersheim to the jurisdiction of Mainz. Thangmar attributes these incidents to Sophia being prideful, irreverent, and falling to excess and vice. Though he is considered to be a very biased source, intending to show Bernward in good light, this may not actually reflect the attitude of Sophia. It is worth noting of Bernward's apparent dislike for Sophia, that Gandersheim was a rather wealthy Abbey, being granted rights to collect tolls at a local major crossroad, mint coins, and to have a market in 990 by Otto III, and if not accepted as having authority there, he would not be able to benefit off of the Abbey's revenues. When Otto III granted these rights to the abbey, he also granted authority to hold a court which would take precedence over other judicial forums.

Sophia and her brother, Otto III, seemed to be on good terms with each other; she received several gifts and attended the 994 Imperial Diet, where Otto was declared to have reached majority. He vested his sister with the estates of Eschwege Abbey, at the explicit wish of their late mother Theophanu who had died in 991. Sophia also acted as an intercessor for her brother on many diplomas granted by his court. From 995 until 997, Sophia was absent from the convent, accompanying her brother on his first Italian campaign. She acted as abbess of Eschwege from 997. Sophia's time in her brother's court allowed her to make many connections with politically powerful people and nobles across Saxony, allowing her to take on a much more active role in politics than the Abbesses which preceded her at Gandersheim.

== Princess-Abbess ==
In 1001, her tutor Abbess Gerberga II of Gandersheim died. However, due to her brother's death, Sophia was not to be elected her successor until 1002, with the approval of the new king Henry II. Likely as a reward for her support of Henry's claim to the throne, Sophia was made Abbess at the same ceremony where Queen Cunigund was crowned. Sophia would later fight her ecclesiastical superiors who, with approval of Emperor Henry II, endangered Gandersheim's privileges and her own status.

In April 1002, Sophia played a significant role in the crowning of Henry II. Sophia, along with her sister, Adelheid of Quedlinburg, attended a gathering of nobles at Werla to discuss the succession of the crown. After an assembly in which many Saxon nobles supported the claim of Duke Henry of Bavaria over Margrave Ekkehard of Meißen, a small feast had been prepared for Sophia and Adelheid. In retaliation for his lack of support, Ekkehard sat at the table before Sophia and Adelheid arrived and ate the food prepared for him. This incident angered Sophia and Adelheid, causing them to further support Henry's claim. After leaving the assembly with critic of Sophia, Bishop Bernward of Hildesheim, Ekkehard was murdered by a group of nobles near Pohlde. After Ekkehard's death, many nobles supported Duke Hermann of Swabia, but the influence of Sophia, Adelheid and other Saxon elites allowed Duke Henry to be crowned Henry II in June 1002. They later legitimized him in 1024, when he visited Vreden and Quedlinburg. Sophia and her sister later played the same role in the election of Conrad II as first Holy Roman Emperor of the Salian dynasty.

In 1011, Sophia was also granted Essen Abbey on the death of her cousin Mathilde. The succession had initially been reserved for her younger sister Matilda, who nevertheless had married Count Palatine Ezzo of Lotharingia instead. According to the local historian Georg Humann (1847–1932), Essen was always secondary for Sophia, and the importance of the abbey declined somewhat under her rule. The rebuilding of Essen Minster was delayed, though recent research suggests that it was Sophia who initiated the remodeling of the Enamel Cross.

== Death ==
She ruled her abbeys successfully until her death in 1039. Despite the help he had received from the sisters, Conrad II denied Adelheid's request to succeed Sophia as Abbess of Gandersheim. Henry III, Holy Roman Emperor, eventually granted Adelheid the right to rule Gandersheim.

== Ancestry ==
Ancestors of Sophia I, Abbess of Gandersheim

16. Otto I, Duke of Saxony
8. Henry I of Germany
17. Hedwiga of Franconia
4. Otto I, Holy Roman Emperor
18. Dietrich, Count in Westphalia
9. Matilda
19. Reinhild
2. Otto II, Holy Roman Emperor
20. Rudolph I of Burgundy
10. Rudolph II of Burgundy
21. Guilla of Provence
5. Adelaide of Italy
22. Burchard II, Duke of Swabia
11. Bertha of Swabia
23. Regelinda of Zürich
1. Sophia I, Abbess of Gandersheim
24. Niketas Skleros
12. Photeinos Skleros
6. Konstantinos Skleros
13. Gregoria
3. Theophanu
28. Bardas Phokas the Elder
14. Leo Phokas the Younger
29. N.N Maleina
7. Sophia Phokaina

Sophia I, Abbess of Gandersheim Ottonian dynasty Born: 975 Died: 30 January 983
Religious titles
Preceded by Gerberga II	Abbess of Gandersheim; 1002–1039	Succeeded by Adelaide II
Preceded by Mathilde	Abbess of Essen; 1011–1039	Succeeded by Theophanu
