= Paul Mikat =

German politician

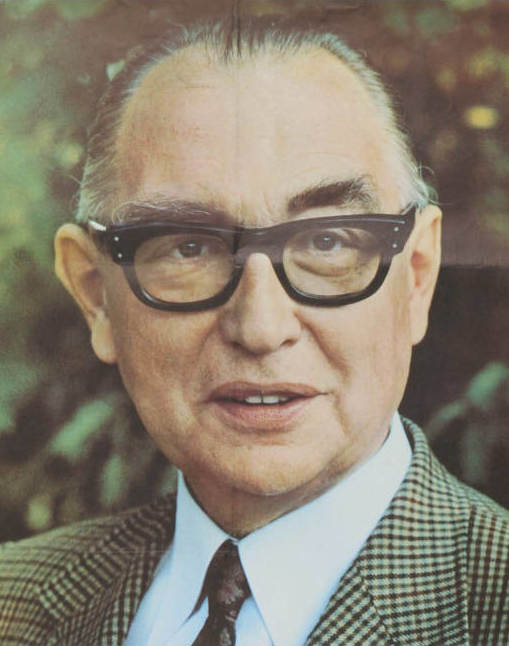
- Paul Mikat, 1980

Member of the Bundestag
- In office 20 October 1969 – 18 February 1987

Personal details
- Born: 10 December 1924 Scherfede, Germany
- Died: 24 September 2011 (aged 86) Düsseldorf, Germany
- Party: Christian Democratic Union (CDU)

Paul Mikat (10 December 1924 – 24 September 2011) was a German politician of the Christian Democratic Union (CDU) and former member of the German Bundestag.

== Life ==
In 1962, Mikat was appointed Minister of Education and Cultural Affairs of the state of North Rhine-Westphalia; he held this office until the change to a social-liberal coalition in 1966. From 1966 to 1969 he was a member of the North Rhine-Westphalian state parliament. From 1969 to 1987 he was a member of the German Bundestag.

== Literature ==
Herbst, Ludolf; Jahn, Bruno (2002). Vierhaus, Rudolf (ed.). Biographisches Handbuch der Mitglieder des Deutschen Bundestages. 1949–2002 [Biographical Handbook of the Members of the German Bundestag. 1949–2002] (in German). München: De Gruyter – De Gruyter Saur. p. 1715. ISBN 978-3-11-184511-1.
