= Sword of Saints Cosmas and Damian =

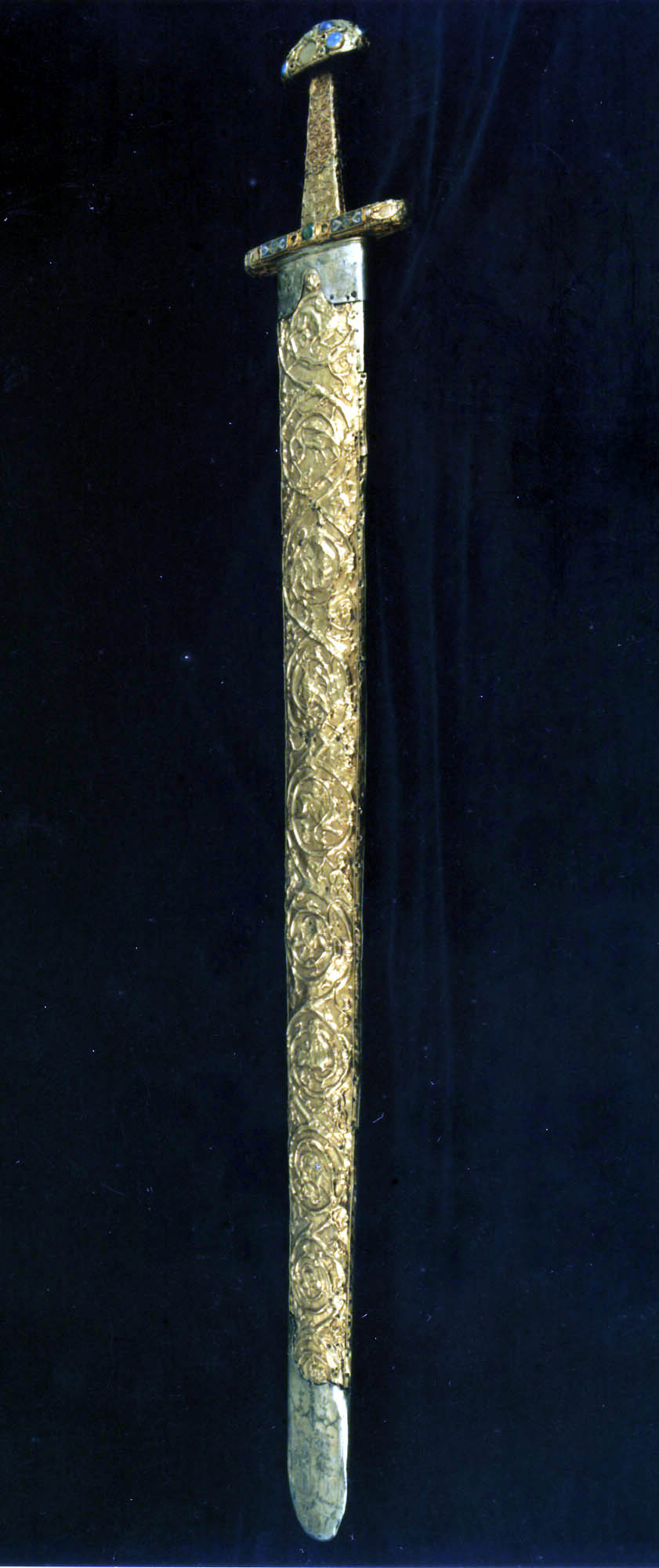
The sword in its scabbard

The Sword of Saints Cosmas and Damian, also known as the Sword of Essen, is a ceremonial weapon in Essen Abbey. The sword itself dates to the mid 10th century, the gold decoration was added at the close of the 10th or the onset of the 11th century, while the silver mounts with the inscription were added 15th century.

The sword was formerly thought to have been a gift by Otto III, Holy Roman Emperor to the convent in Essen in AD 993, and taken to commemorate the martyrdom of Saints Cosmas and Damian, the patron saints of that city.

An examination of the sword in the 1990s led to the conclusion that the sword most likely dates to the third quarter of the 10th century, and had probably been used in combat before it was decorated at the end of the 10th century. The dating of the decorations is based on the close similarity of the spiral patterns to those of a bronze chandelier in Essen cathedral which bears an inscription associating it with abbess Mathilde, Abbess of Essen (d. 1011).

The blade is 93.6 cm (36.9 in) long. It features gold filigree though not much of this remains, along with precious stones and decorative enamel plates. The scabbard is lined with beechwood and covered in embossed gold plates, some of which have at some time been restored, that depict spirals, foliage and animals. The silver locket mounts show images of Saints Cosmas and Damian, along with the Latin inscription: GLADIVS CVM QVO DECOLLATI FVERVNT NOSTRI PATRONI ("the sword, with which our patrons were beheaded").
