= Georg Humann =

German architect and art historian

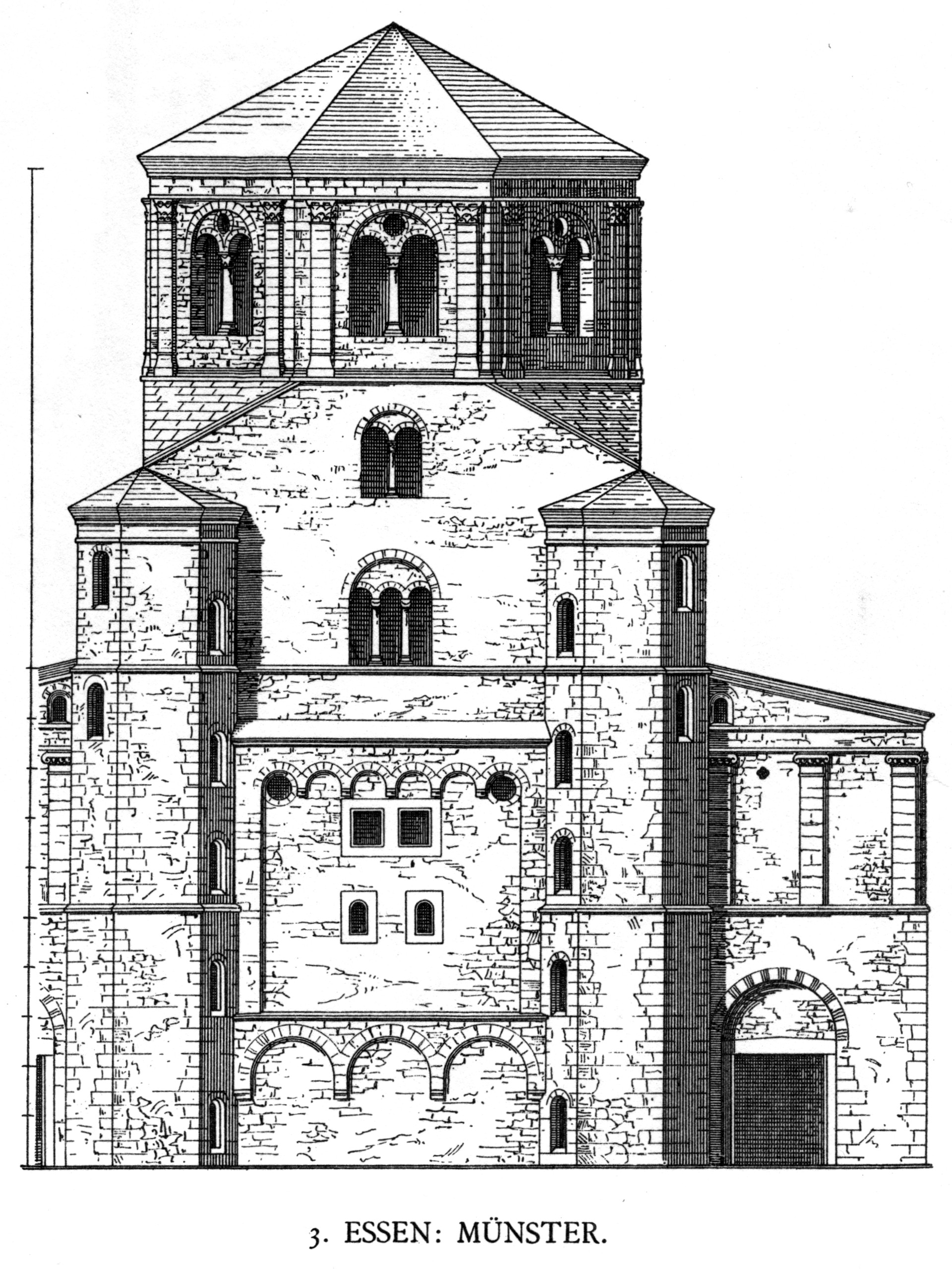
Architectural drawing of Essen Minster, drawn by Georg Humann und used by Georg Dehio

Georg Humann (8 December 1847, in Rellinghausen (now a suburb of Essen) – 18 January 1932, in Aachen) was a German art historian.

== Life ==
Humann belong to a long-established Essen family, his father was steward of the estates of Schloss Schellenberg. Humann studied architecture, like his better known cousin Carl Humann, the discoverer of the Pergamon altar. He attended the Polytechnische Schule Hannover from 1873 to 1876. After completing his studies, he returned to Essen, where he dwelt in his maternal family home. For health reasons he was unable to work as an architect.

Humann dedicated himself to the Essen Cathedral Treasury and Minster, stimulated by the gothicization of the Minster from 1880. Humann represented an alternative perspective to that of the architect in charge, Peter Zindel, whose plans foresaw the gothicization of the westwerk. Humann prevailed over him when he called in the Prussian conservator Heinrich von Dehn-Rotfelser. Humann's books derive from his work on the Minster and its treasury and were highly valued by his contemporaries, such that Georg Dehio used Humann's line drawings for his section on Essen Minster in his Handbuch der deutschen Kunstdenkmäler (Handbook of German Artistic Monuments).

Humann received an honorary doctorate from the Royal Theological and Philosophical Academy of Münster for his research in 1908, as well as Honorary membership of the Essen Historical Society. After his house in Essen had to be sold in 1897 because of an inheritance dispute, Humann settled in Aachen, where he lived in the Vinzenzstift from 1900 and died in 1932.

His private library, with around 300 individual volumes on art history as well as his own work was donated by Humann to the Stadtbibliothek Aachen after his death.

== Legacy ==
Many of Georg Humann's art historical conclusions have been superseded by newer research, but his works are still used today, because Humann's observations, descriptions and drawings are very precise. Therefore, his work enables in many cases a comparison of present conditions with those before the First World War. In 1890 Humann proposed an early date for the Essen Westwerk on stylistic grounds, which was not accepted but has lately been taken up once more.

Humann's intervention to protect the Ottonian style of Essen's Westwerk saved it from being converted into a neo-Gothic building. Furthermore, during the preparation of his book about the Cathedral Treasury, he discovered that the wooden interior of the Golden Madonna was full of woodworm, prompting restoration work without which the figure would probably not have survived.

== Selected works ==
- Die Restauration kirchlicher Bauwerke (The Restoration of Church Buildings). Essen 1880.
- Der Westbau des Münsters zu Essen (The Westwerk of Essen Minster). Essen 1890 (Digitised).
- Die ältesten Bautheile des Münsters zu Essen. (The Oldest Built Elements of Essen Minster). Bonn 1892.
- Die ehemaligen Abteigebäude zu Essen. (The Former Abbey Buildings at Essen). Essen 1894.
- "Zur Beurteilung mittelalterlicher Kunstwerke in Bezug auf ihre zeitliche und örtliche Entstehung." (On the Assessment of Medieval Artworks in Connection with their Temporal and Geographical Origins) In: Repertorium für Kunstwissenschaft 25, 1902, pp. 9–40.
- Die Kunstwerke der Münsterkirche zu Essen (The Artworks of Essen Minster). Düsseldorf 1904.
- Die Beziehungen der Handschriftornamentik zur romanischen Baukunst. (The Relationship of Manuscript Decorations with Romanesque Architecture) Heitz, Straßburg 1907.
- Zur Geschichte der karolingischen Baukunst. (On the History of Carolingian Architecture). Part I. Heitz, Straßburg 1909. Part II. Heitz, Straßburg 1911.
- Die Baukunst unter Bischof Meinwerk von Paderborn. (Architecture under Bishop Meinwerk von Paderborn). Aachen 1918 (Digitised).
- Karolingisch-frühromanische Baukunst in Essen. (Carolingian & Early Romanesque Architecture in Essen). Aachen 1924.
- Stützenwechsel in der romanischen Baukunst insbesondere bei Kreuzgängen und Zwerggalerien. (Changes to Support Structures in Romanesque Architecture, particularly in Cloisters and Dwarf Galleries. Heitz, Straßburg 1925.

== Bibliography ==
- Joseph Buchkremer: "Dr. Georg Humann." In: Zentralblatt der Bauverwaltung, 46. Jahrgang 1926, No. 48, pp. 544–545. (PDF; 2,5 MB)
- Karl Mews: "Georg Humann †." In: Beiträge zur Geschichte von Stadt und Stift Essen, 50, 1932, pp. 1–5 (with image).
- Karl Mews: "Georg Humann, der Entdecker des Essener Münsters." In: Münster am Hellweg, Mitteilungsblatt des Vereins für die Erhaltung des Essener Münsters, 2, 1949, pp. 6–7.
