= Aachen Cathedral =

Catholic cathedral in Aachen, Germany

- Aachener Dom
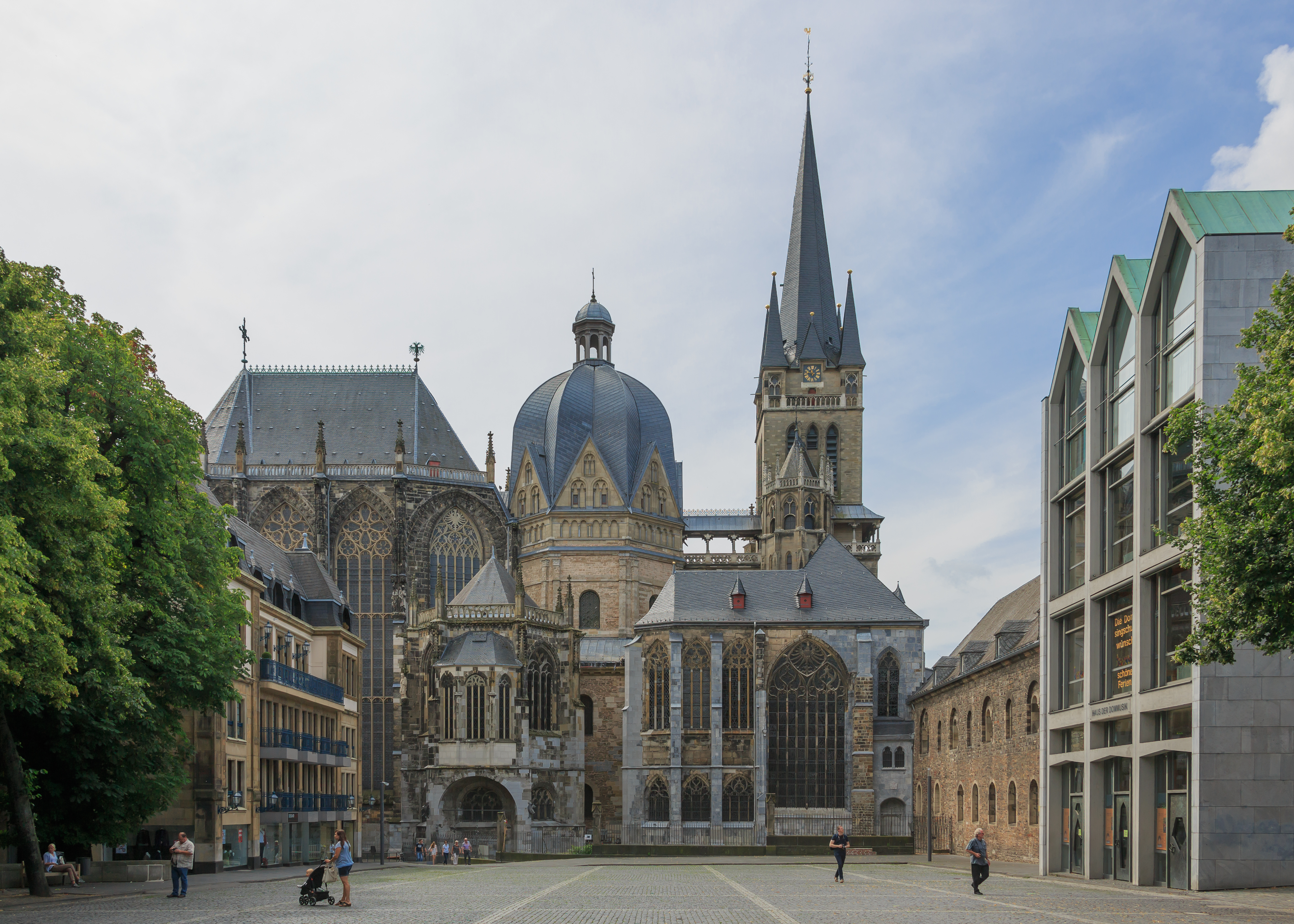
- The cathedral in 2014

Religion
- Affiliation: Catholic
- Province: Diocese of Aachen
- Ecclesiastical or organisational status: active
- Year consecrated: 805
- Status: Cathedral

Location
- Location: Aachen, North Rhine-Westphalia, Germany
- Interactive map of Aachen Cathedral
- Coordinates: 50°46′29.1″N 6°5′2.12″E

Architecture
- Style: Ottonian; Carolingian-Romanesque; Gothic
- Founder: Charlemagne
- Groundbreaking: 796

Specifications
- Length: 73 m (239 ft 6 in)
- Width: 56 m (183 ft 9 in)
- Spire: 1
- Spire height: 72 m (236 ft 3 in)

UNESCO World Heritage Site
- Criteria: Cultural: i, ii, iv, vi
- Reference: 3
- Inscription: 1978 (2nd Session)
- Area: 0.2 ha (0.49 acres)
- Buffer zone: 67 ha (170 acres)

Aachen Cathedral (German: Aachener Dom) is a Catholic church in Aachen, Germany, and the cathedral of the Diocese of Aachen.

One of the oldest cathedral buildings in Europe, it was constructed as the royal chapel of the Palace of Aachen of Emperor Charlemagne, who was buried there in 814. From 936 to 1531, the original Palatine Chapel saw the coronation of thirty-one German kings. Later, much expanded, it was a minster and collegiate church, becoming a cathedral briefly from 1803 to 1825, and again in 1930 when the Diocese of Aachen was revived. In 1978, Aachen Cathedral was one of the first 12 sites to be listed on the UNESCO list of World Heritage Sites, because of its exceptional artistry, architecture, and central importance in the history of the Holy Roman Empire.

The cathedral mostly uses two distinct architectural styles. First, the core of the cathedral is the Carolingian-Romanesque Palatine Chapel, which was modeled after the Basilica of San Vitale at Ravenna and is notably small in comparison to the later additions. Secondly, the choir was constructed in the Gothic style. There are portions that show Ottonian style, such as the area around the throne, and some areas were not completed until the 19th century, in revivalist styles.

== History ==
Animation of Aachen cathedral (English subtitles)

Charlemagne began the construction of the Palatine Chapel around 796, along with the rest of the palace structures. The construction is credited to Odo of Metz. The exact date of completion is unclear; however, a letter from Alcuin, in 798, states that it was nearing completion, and in 805, Pope Leo III consecrated the finished chapel. A foundry was brought to Aachen near the end of the 8th century and was utilized to cast multiple bronze pieces, from doors and the railings, to the horse and bear statues. (Note: The bronze pine cone that still adorns the chapel may have been cast from this foundry or it may have been brought from Rome.) Charlemagne was buried in the chapel in 814. It suffered a large amount of damage in a Viking raid in 881, and was restored in 983.

Following Charlemagne's canonization by Antipope Paschal III in 1165, the chapel became a draw for pilgrims. Due to the enormous flow of pilgrims, in 1355 a Gothic choir hall was added, and a two-part Capella vitrea (glass chapel) was consecrated on the 600th anniversary of Charlemagne's death. A cupola, several other chapels, and a steeple were also constructed at later dates. It was restored again in 1881, when the Baroque stucco was removed.

Floorplan of Charlemagne's Palatine Chapel

During World War II, Aachen, including its famed cathedral, was heavily damaged by Allied bombing attacks and artillery fire, and the subsequent ground fighting when U.S. troops attacked the city, but the cathedral's basic structure survived. Many of the cathedral's artistic objects had been removed to secure storage during the war, and some which could not be moved were protected within the church itself. However, the glazing of the 14th-century choir hall, the Gothic Revival altar, a large part of the cloister, and the Holiness Chapel (Heiligtumskapelle) were irretrievably destroyed. Reconstruction and restoration took place intermittently over more than 30 years, and cost an estimated €40 million.

== Structure ==
=== Carolingian Octagon (Palatine chapel) ===
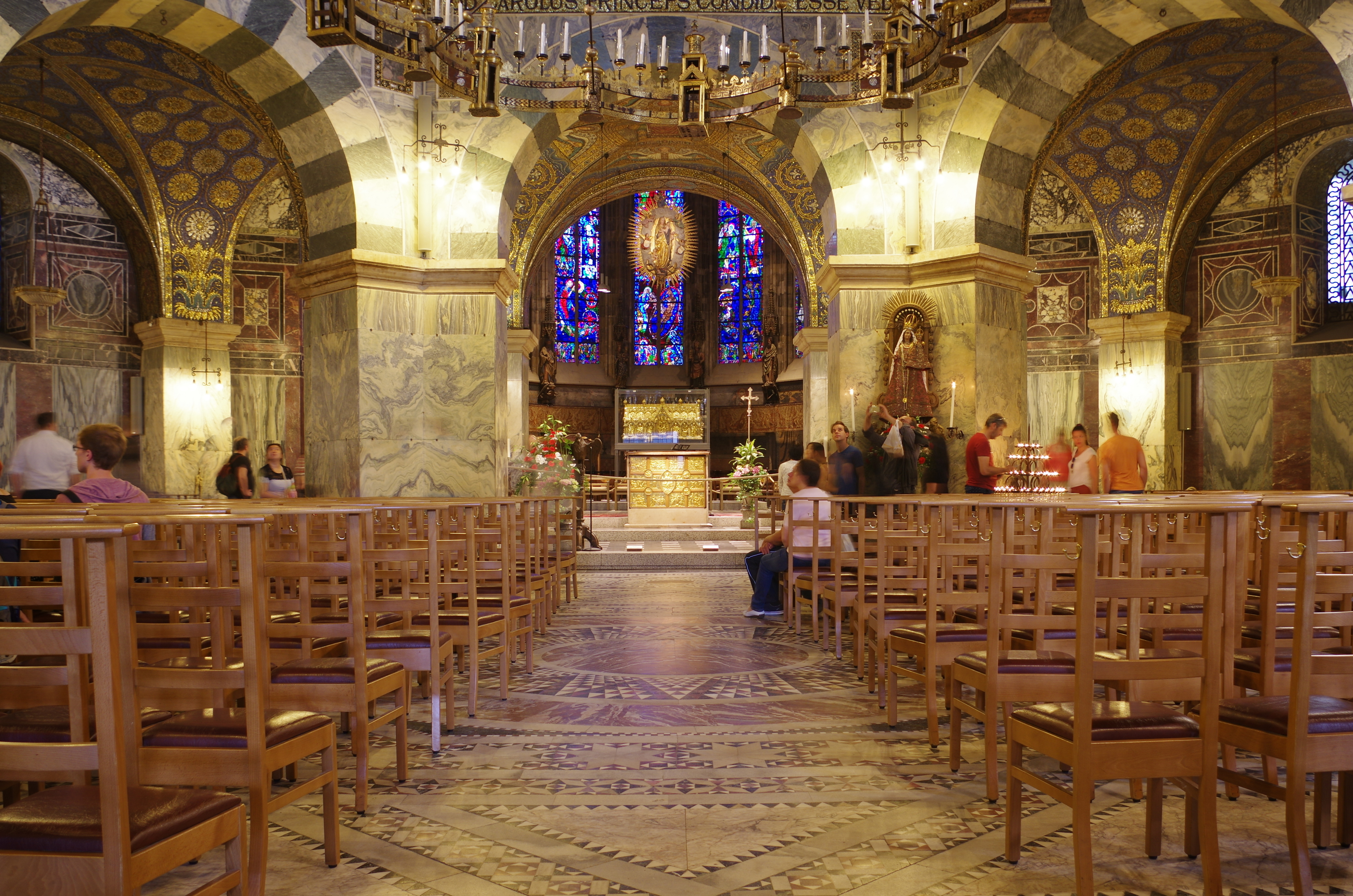
View of the Octagon

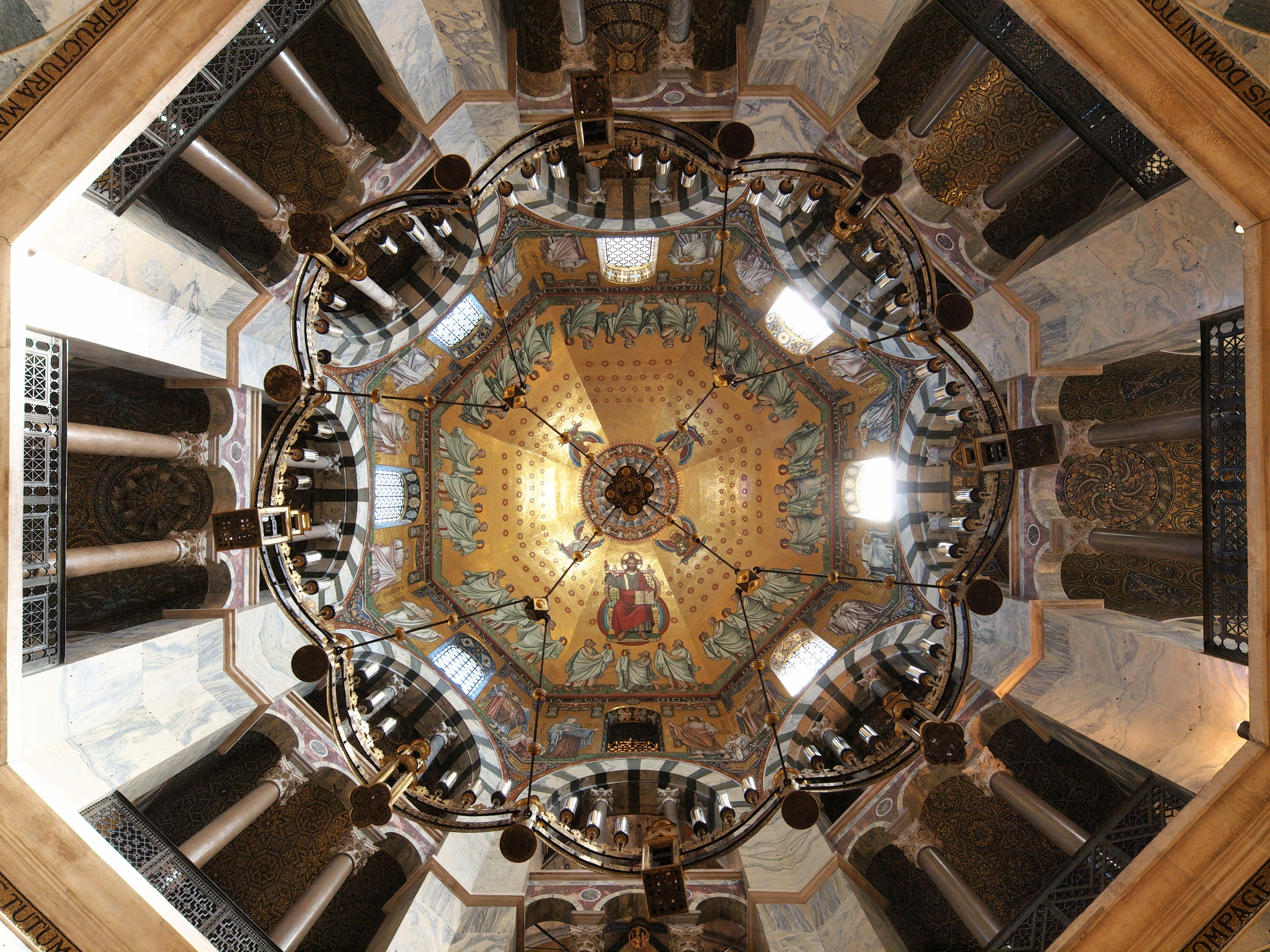
The Barbarossa chandelier under the dome of the Octagon

The octagon in the centre of the cathedral was erected as the chapel of the Palace of Aachen between 796 and 805 on the model of other contemporary Byzantine buildings (e.g. the Basilica of San Vitale in Ravenna and the Little Hagia Sophia in Constantinople). The architect was Odo of Metz, and the original design was of a domed octagonal inner room enveloped by a 16 sided outer wall. The span and height of Charlemagne's Palatine chapel was unsurpassed north of the Alps for over two hundred years.

The Palatine chapel consisted of a high octagonal room with a two-story circuit below. The inner octagon, with a diameter of 14.46 metres (47.4 ft), is made up of strong piers, on which an octagonal cloister vault lies, covering the central room. Around this inner octagon is a sixteen sided circuit of low groin vaults, supporting a high gallery above. This upper story was known as the Hochmünster (high church). The arched openings of the lower story are only about half as high as those of the Hochmünster, as a result of which the lower story looks stocky and bulky. The two floors are separated from each other by an expansive cornice. The high altar and Imperial throne are located on the upper circuit of the Palatine chapel in an octagonal side room, covered by a barrel vault lying on an angle. This area was connected to the palace by a passage. Above the arches of the gallery, an octagonal drum with window openings rises, on top of which is the cupola. On the east end was a small apse that protruded and was, in later years, replaced by the choir. Opposite of this, was the tiered entrance to the rest of the now defunct palace, Westwork. Light is brought in by a three tiered system of circular arched windows. The corners of the octagonal dome are joined with the walls with a system of paired pilasters with corinthian capitals.

The upper gallery openings are divided by a grid of columns. These columns are ancient and come from St. Gereon in Cologne. Charlemagne allowed further spolia to be brought to Aachen from Rome and Ravenna at the end of the 8th century. In 1794, during the French occupation of the Rheinland, they were removed to Paris, but in 1815 up to half the pieces remaining in the Louvre were brought back to Aachen. In the 1840s they were restored to their original places once more and new columns of Odenberg granite were substituted for the missing columns. The interior walls were initially lined with a marble facade. The round arched openings in the upper floor in the side walls of the octagon, between the columns, in front of a mezzanine, are decorated with a metre-high railing of Carolingian bronze rails. These bronze rails were cast 1200 years ago in a single piece according to Roman models. The original cupola mosaic was probably executed around 800 and known from Medieval sources depicted Christ as the triumphant Lord of the world, surrounded by the symbols of the Four Evangelists, with the twenty-four elders from the Apocalypse of John offering their crowns to him. In 1880–81 it was recreated by the Venetian workshop of Antonio Salviati, according to the plans of the Belgian architect Jean-Baptiste de Béthune. The dome was intricately decorated with a mosaic tile.

The exterior walls of the Carolingian octagon, made of quarry stone, are largely unjointed and lack further ornamentation. The only exception is that the projections of the pillars of the cupola are crowned by antique capitals. Above the Carolingian masonry, there is a Romanesque series of arches above a late Roman gable. The Octagon is crowned by unusual baroque vents.

Aachen Cathedral was plastered red in the time of Charlemagne, according to the most recent findings of the Rheinish Office for Monuments. This plaster was made longer-lasting through the addition of crushed red brick. The colour was probably also a reference to the imperial associations of the work.

==== Geometry ====
The question of which geometric concepts and basic dimensions lie at the basis of the chapel's construction is not entirely clear even today. Works of earlier cathedral architects mostly followed either the Drusian foot (334 mm) or the Roman foot (295.7 mm). However, these measurements require complex theories to explain the church's actual dimensions. In 2012, the architectural historian Ulrike Heckner proposed a theory of a new, hitherto unknown unit of measure of 322.4 mm, the so-called Carolingian foot, to which all other measurements in the Palatine chapel can be traced back. This measurement is referred to as the Aachener Königsfuß (Aachen royal foot), after the similarly sized Parisian royal foot (324.8 mm).

Beyond this, there is a symbolic layer to the octagon. Eight was a symbol of the eighth day (Sunday as the sabbath) and therefore symbolised the Resurrection of Jesus Christ and the promise of eternal life. Likewise, ten, the number of perfection in Medieval architectural symbolism, is frequent in the Palatine Chapel: Its diameter (including the circuit surrounding the dome) measures a hundred Carolingian feet (i. e. ten by ten) – equivalent to the height of the dome.

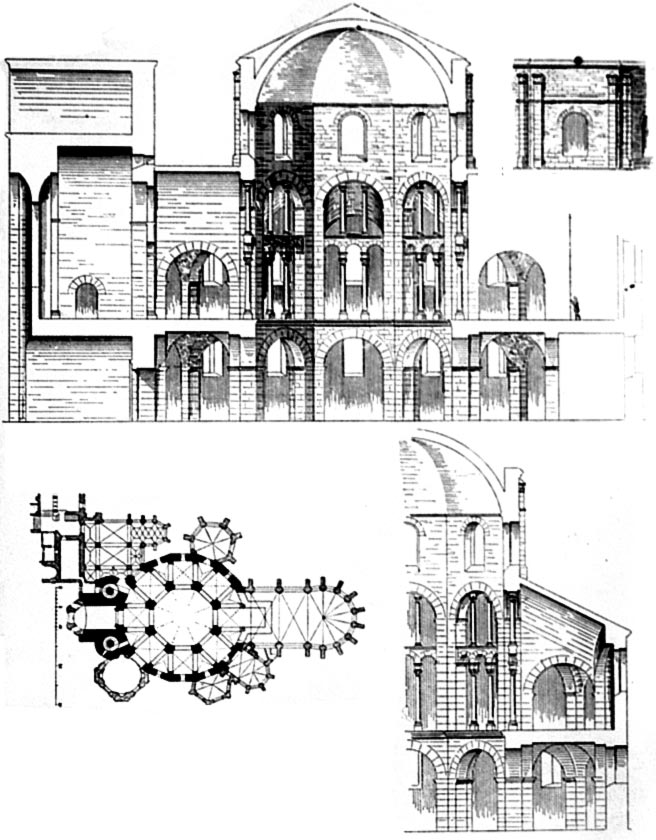
Ground plan & cross-sections

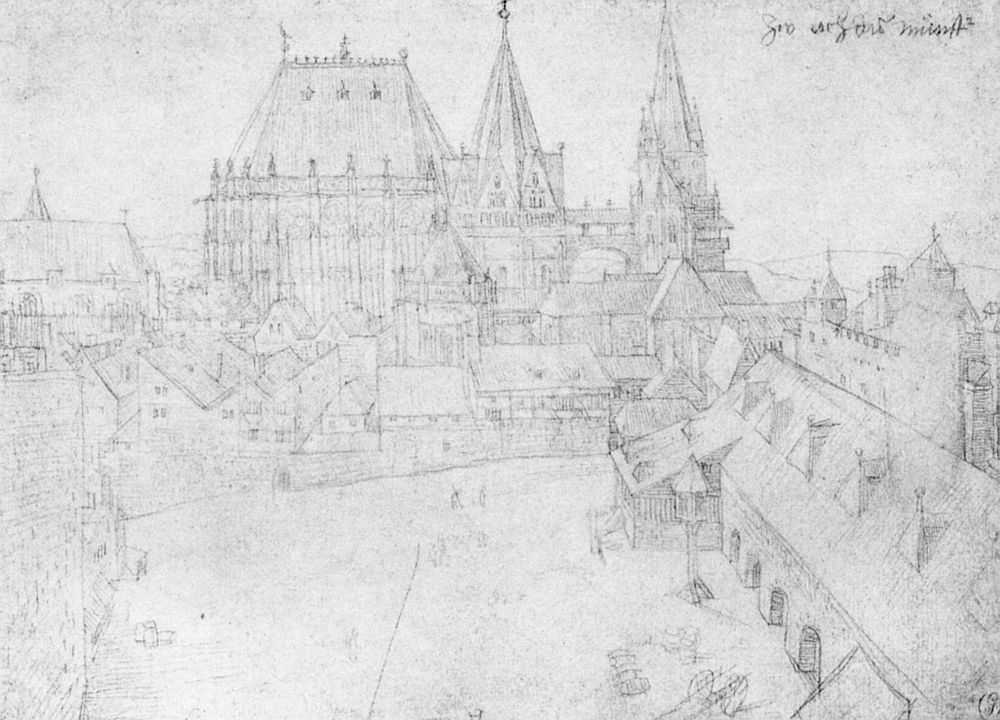
Aachen Cathedral 1520, depicted by Albrecht Dürer

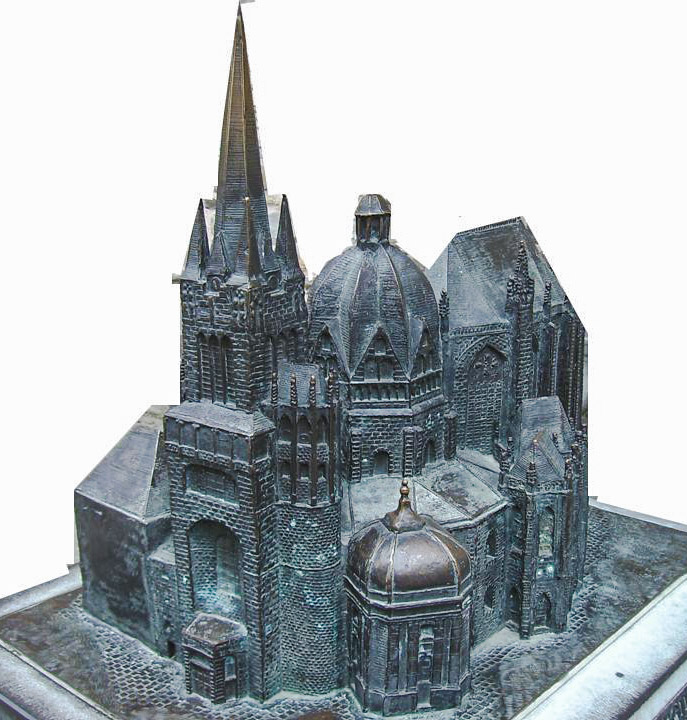
Bronze model near the main entrance

=== Westwork ===
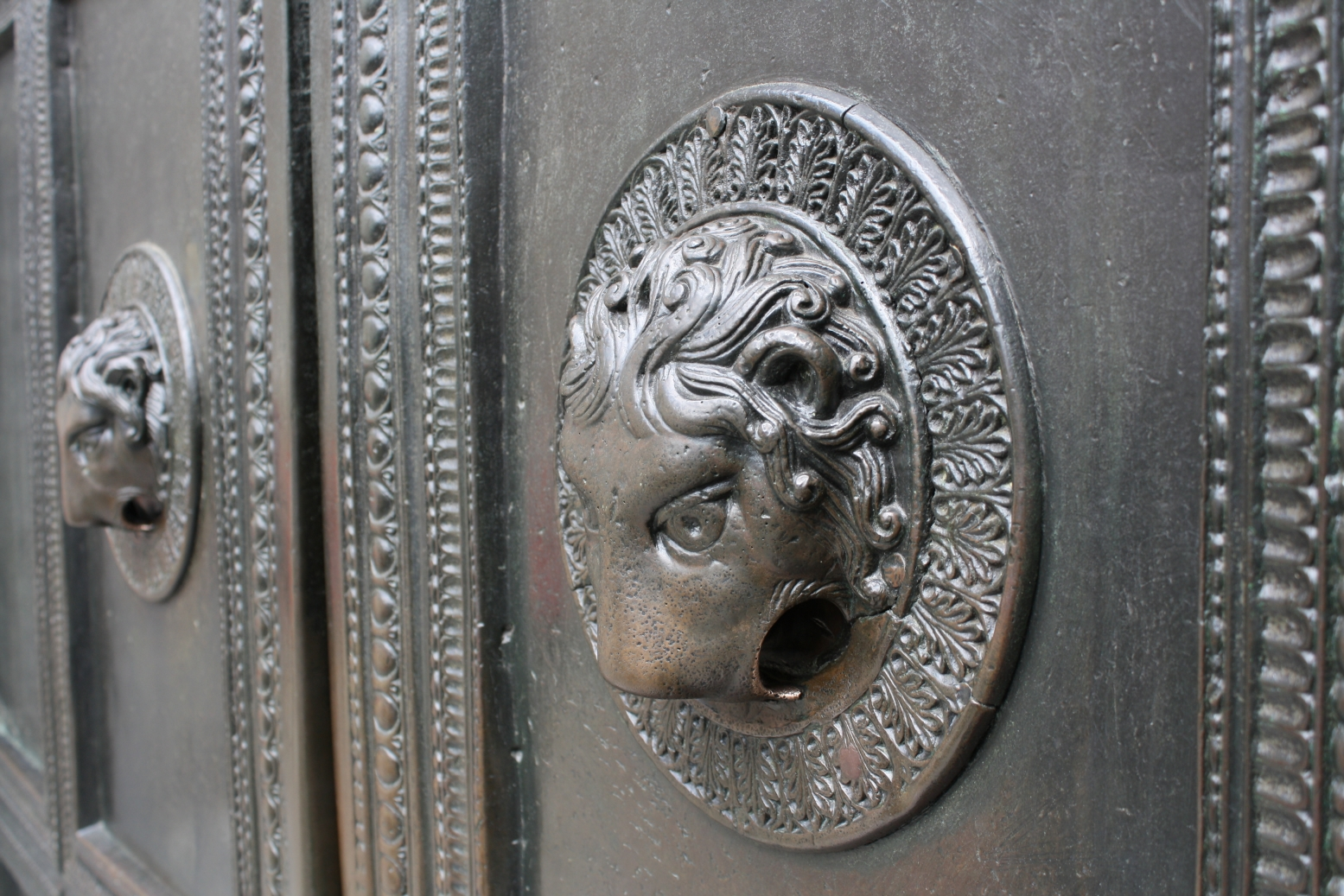
Lion head doorknocker of the Carolingian Wolf's Door

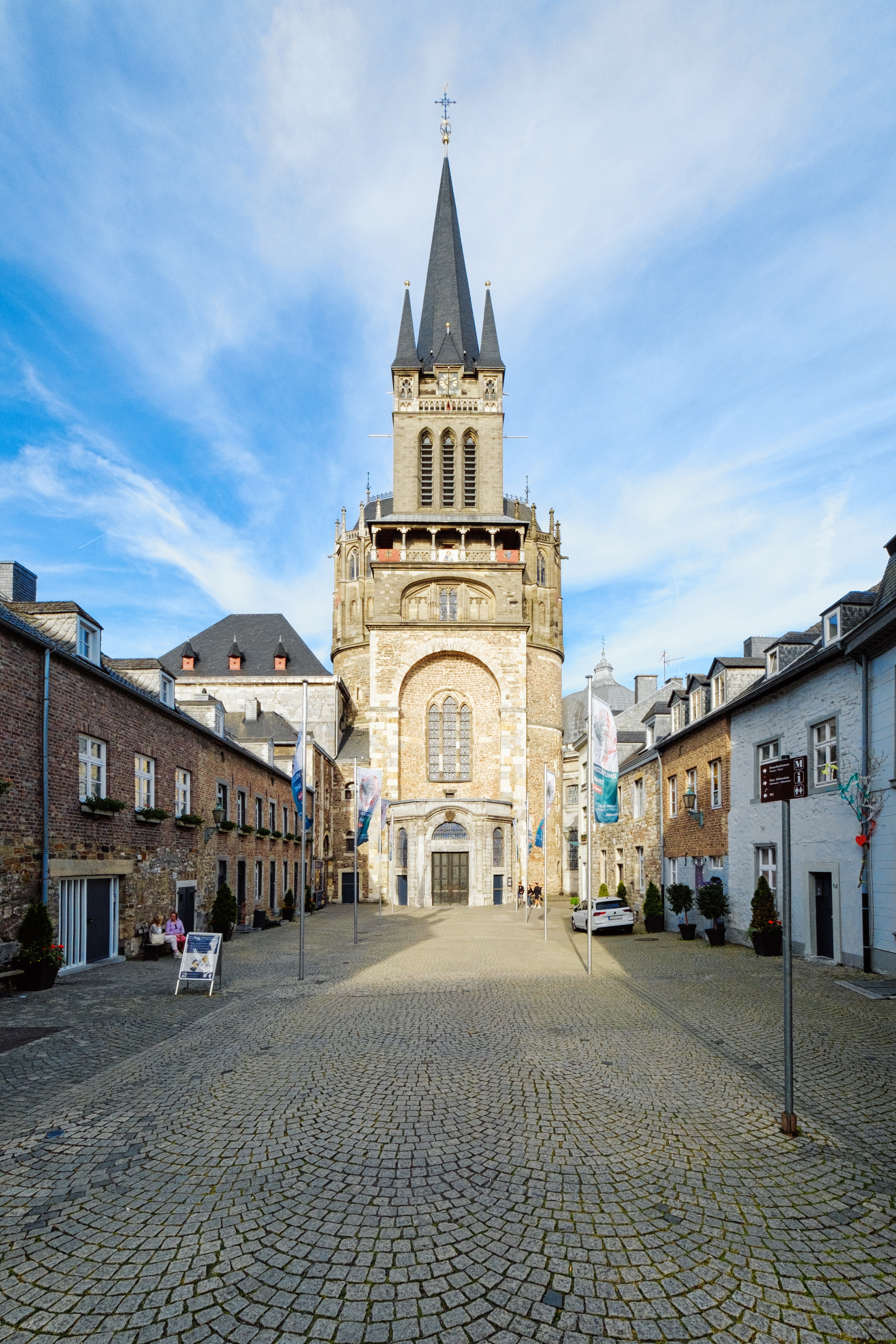
Aachen Cathedral seen from the west

The westwork (western facade) of the cathedral is of Carolingian origin, flanked by two stair-towers. It is a two-story building, completed by a porch from the 18th century at the west end.

The bronze leaves attached to this porch, the Wolfstür (Wolf's Door), weigh 43 hundredweight altogether (cf. with this the Lousberg saga). The main entrance to the cathedral, the door was cast in Aachen around 800 and was located between the westwork and the octagon in the so-called hexadecagon up to 1788. The portal was restored in 1924. Each leaf is divided into eight rectangles – a number which had religious symbolism in Christianity, as a symbol of Sunday, the day of the Resurrection of Jesus Christ and also of perfection (as did twelve, also) and can be found in the measurements of the Palatine Chapel over and over again. These boxes were framed by decorative strips, which are made of egg-shaped decorations. The egg was considered a symbol of life and fertility from antiquity. In Christian belief it was imbued with the even wider symbolism of Eternal Life. The door-rings in the shape of lions' heads are wreathed by 24 (i.e. two times twelve or three times eight) acanthus scrolls – again to be understood at the deepest level through numerology. The Wolfstür's imitation of the shape of the ancient Roman temple door signifies Charlemagne's claim, to have established a New Rome in Aachen with the Palatine Chapel as the distinctive monumental building.

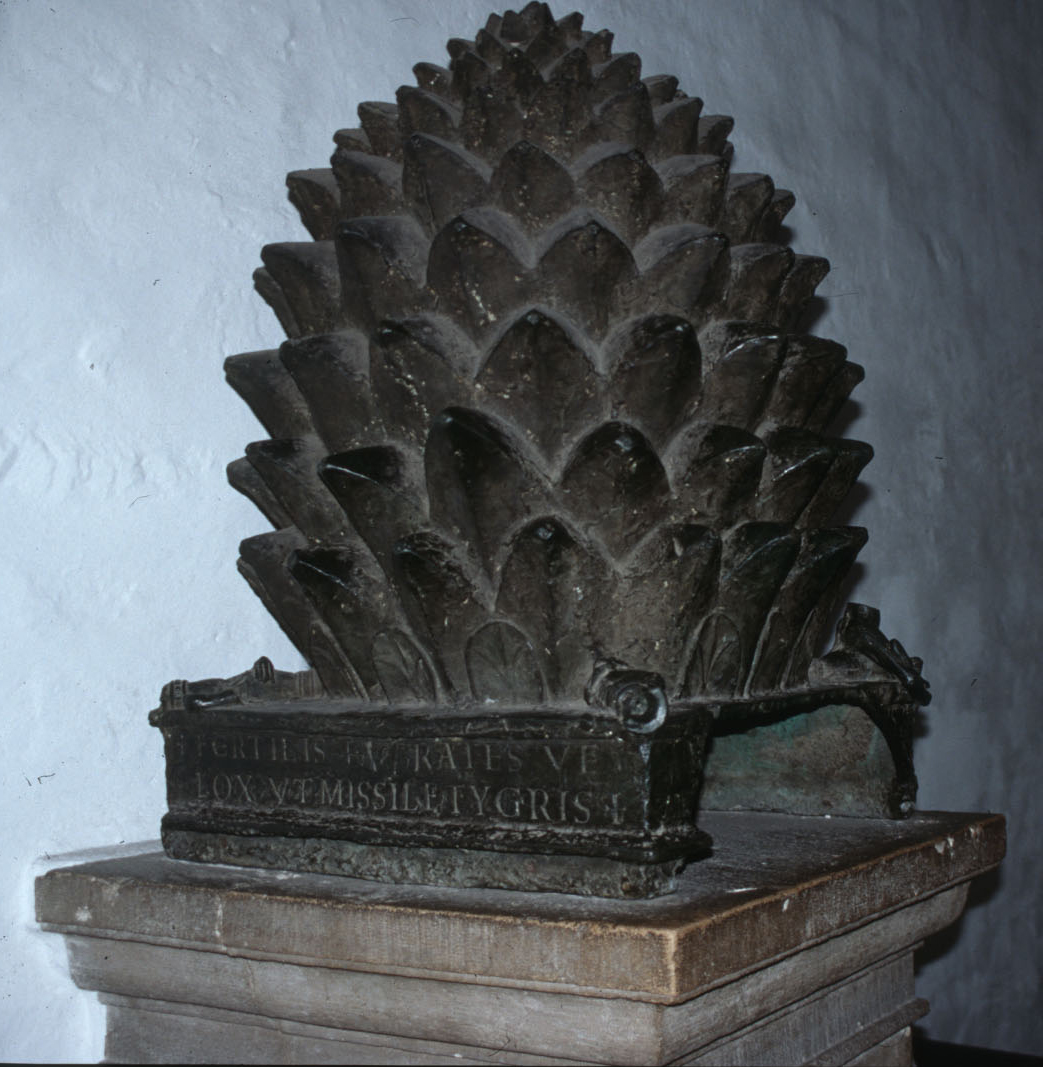
Bronze pine cone in the entrance hall

There were multiple sculptures, made of bronze, including an equestrian piece probably meant as a parallel of a statue of Marcus Aurelius in Rome. In the forehall, there is a bronze sculpture of a bear, which was probably made in the 10th century, i.e. in Ottonian times. Opposite it is a bronze pine cone with 129 perforated scales, which stands 91 cm high (including its base); its date is controversial and ranges from the 3rd to the 10th century. Its base is clearly Ottonian and includes an inscription written in dactylic hexameter, which refers to the Tigris and Euphrates rivers of Mesopotamia. According to one view, the pine cone would originally have served as a waterspout on a fountain and would have been placed in the atrium of the Palatine chapel in Carolingian times.

The upper level is characterised by an exceptionally fine brick western wall. Inside, it bulges outward, while the outside bulges inwards, so that the Carolingian west wall can be seen as a convex-concave bulge. Before the construction of the porch in the 18th century, the Carolingian west facade, when seen from the Narthex, was particularly evocative: a large niche, topped by a semicircular arch in the western upper level corresponded to the semicircle of the barrel vault of the lower level.

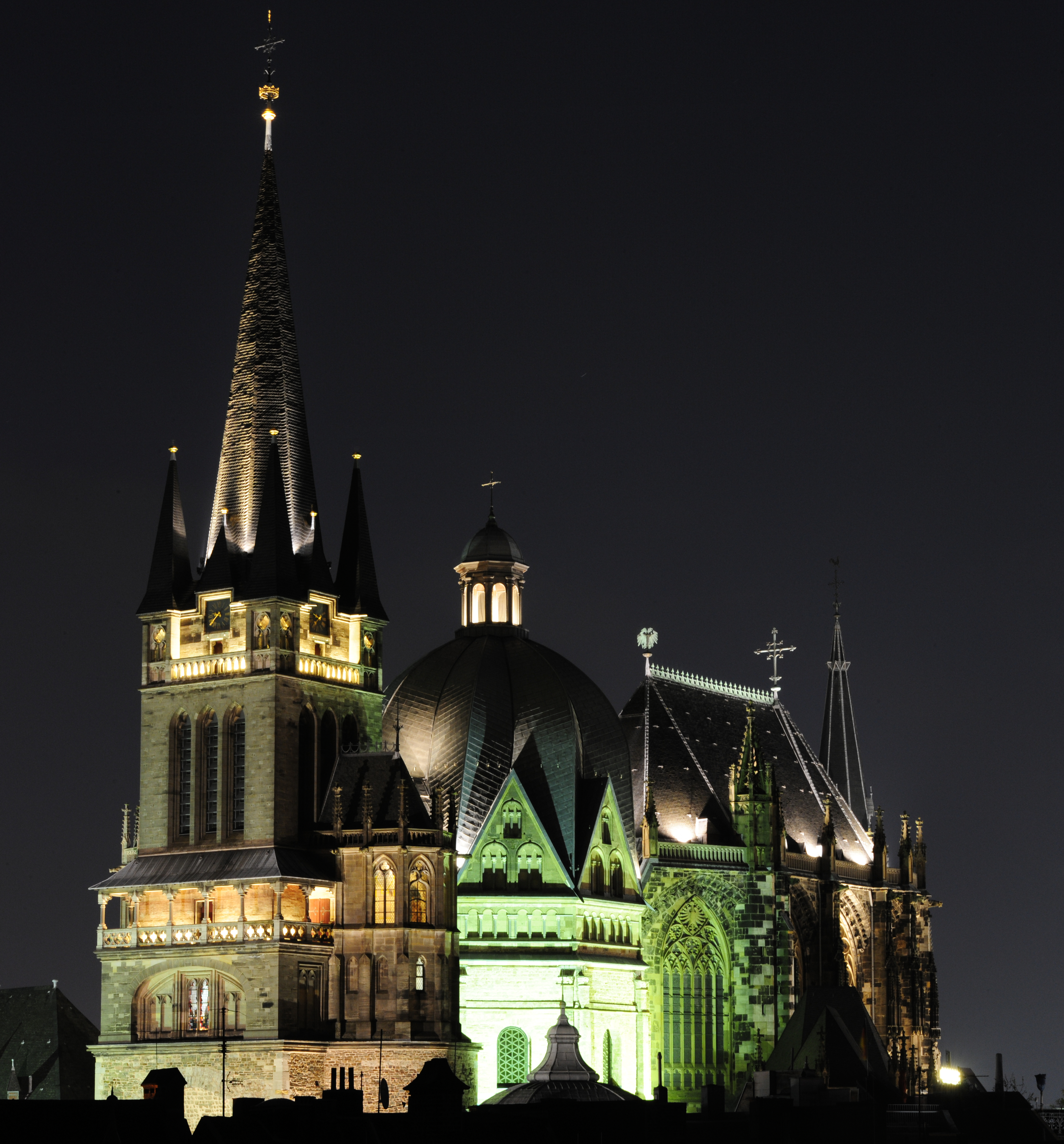
View from west-south-west at night

Today, the western wall is broken up by the large western window. The large window frame dates from the Gothic period and replaced a smaller window from Carolingian times, which was probably structured as a mullion (a double arch with a column in the centre). The modern window was designed by Ewald Mataré in 1956. Mataré's design imitates, however abstractly, the structure of the Carolingian bronze gate inside the dome. Bronze and unprocessed quartz form the window itself.

The function of the upstairs part of the west facade is not entirely clear. The right of baptism (long reserved for the Collegiate Church of Mary) was at a baptismal font, which was behind the marble throne, until the end of the Ancien Régime. Possibly the space was involved in these ceremonies. Furthermore, in the western wall, under the great west window, there is a Fensetella (small window) even today, through which there is line of sight to the court below, the former atrium. It is certain that the so-called Carolingian Passage entered this room on its northern wall, connecting the Aula Regia (King's Hall) in the north of the palace with the church.

The lower, barrel-vaulted room in the west probably served as Charlemagne's sepulchre after his death on 28 January 814 and his burial in the Persephone sarcophagus.

The floors of the western facade lying above this room were remodelled in the first half of the 14th century and in the 17th century; the tower was completed between 1879 and 1884.

=== Choir ===
Between 1355 and 1414, on the initiative of the Marienstift and the mayor of Aachen Gerhard Chorus (1285–1367), a Gothic choir was built to the east of the Octagon. Before this there must have been a rectangular Carolingian choir.

The Gothic choir measures 25m in length, 13m wide and 32m high. Its external wall is broken, as much as possible, by windows – the surface area of the glass is more than 1,000m² and led to the name Glashaus (glass house). This was conceived as a glass reliquary for the holy relics of Aachen and for the body of Charlemagne. The design is arranged on the model of the Sainte-Chapelle in Paris, likewise a space for important relics and a royal palace chapel. For protection of the vault of the choir, iron rods were built in at the time of construction, to counter the lateral force on the narrow stone supports and to allow as much space as possible between them for window space.

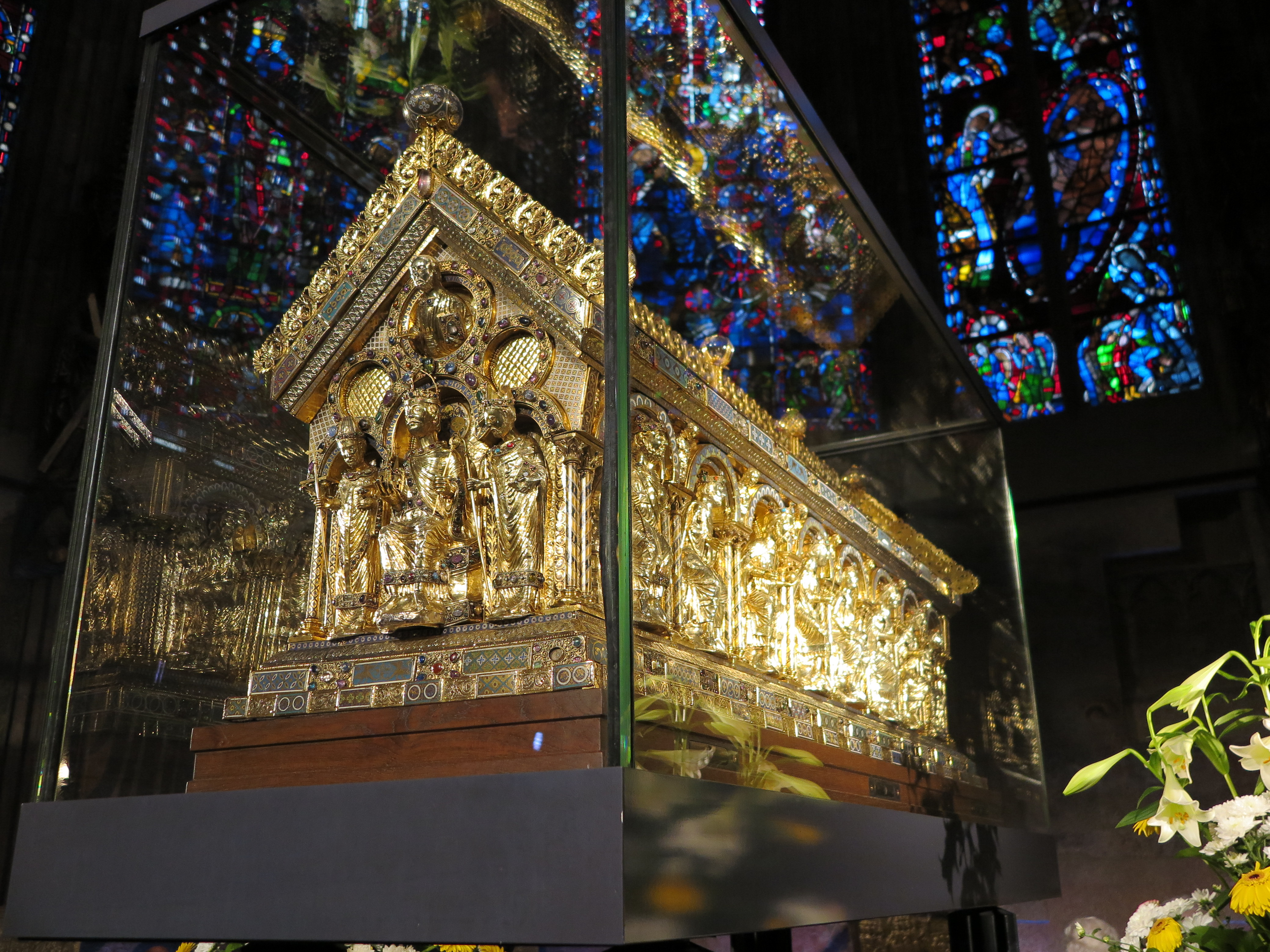
Karlsschrein (between 1182 and 1215)

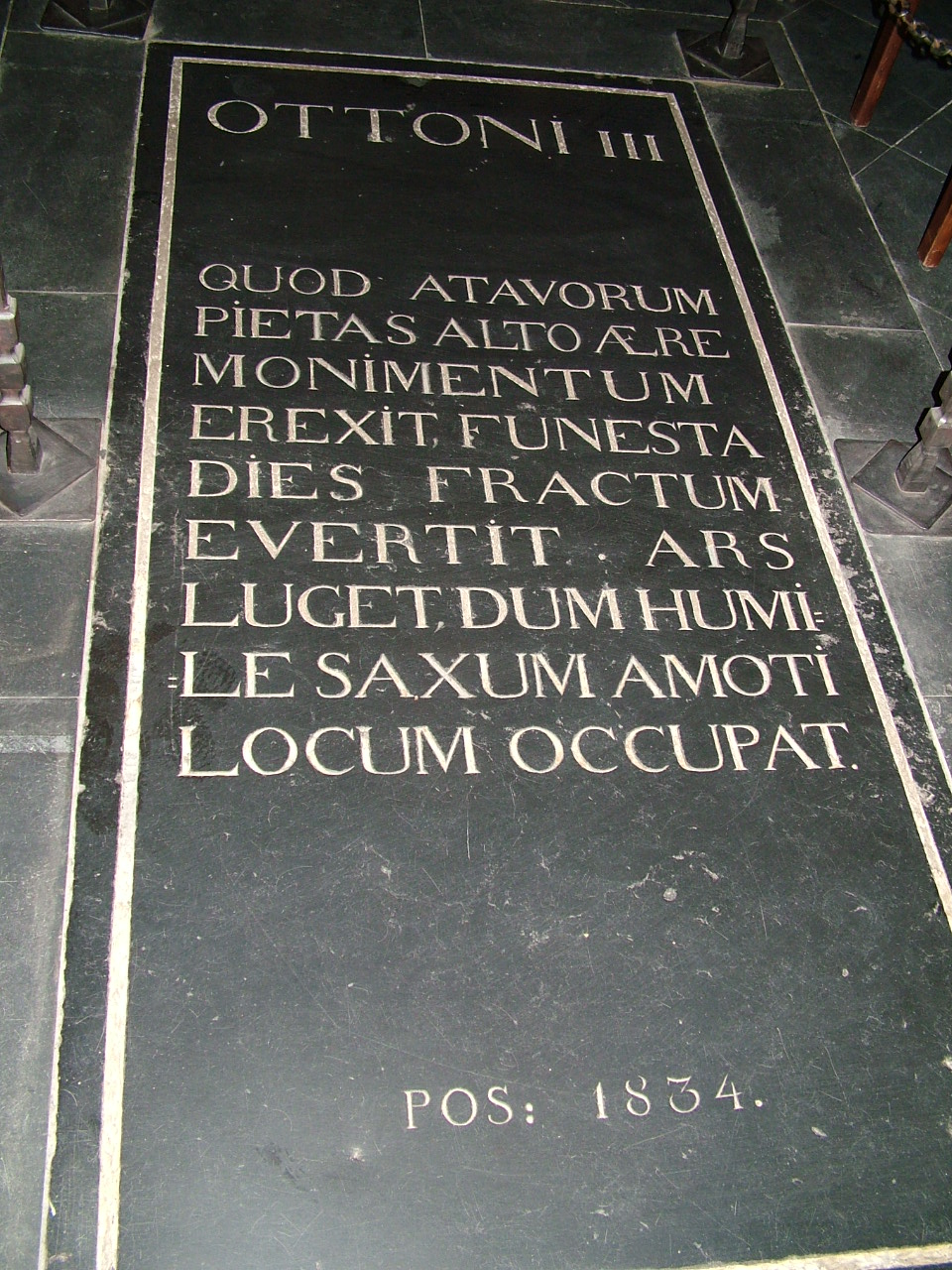
Tomb of Otto III, Holy Roman Emperor (r.996-1002)

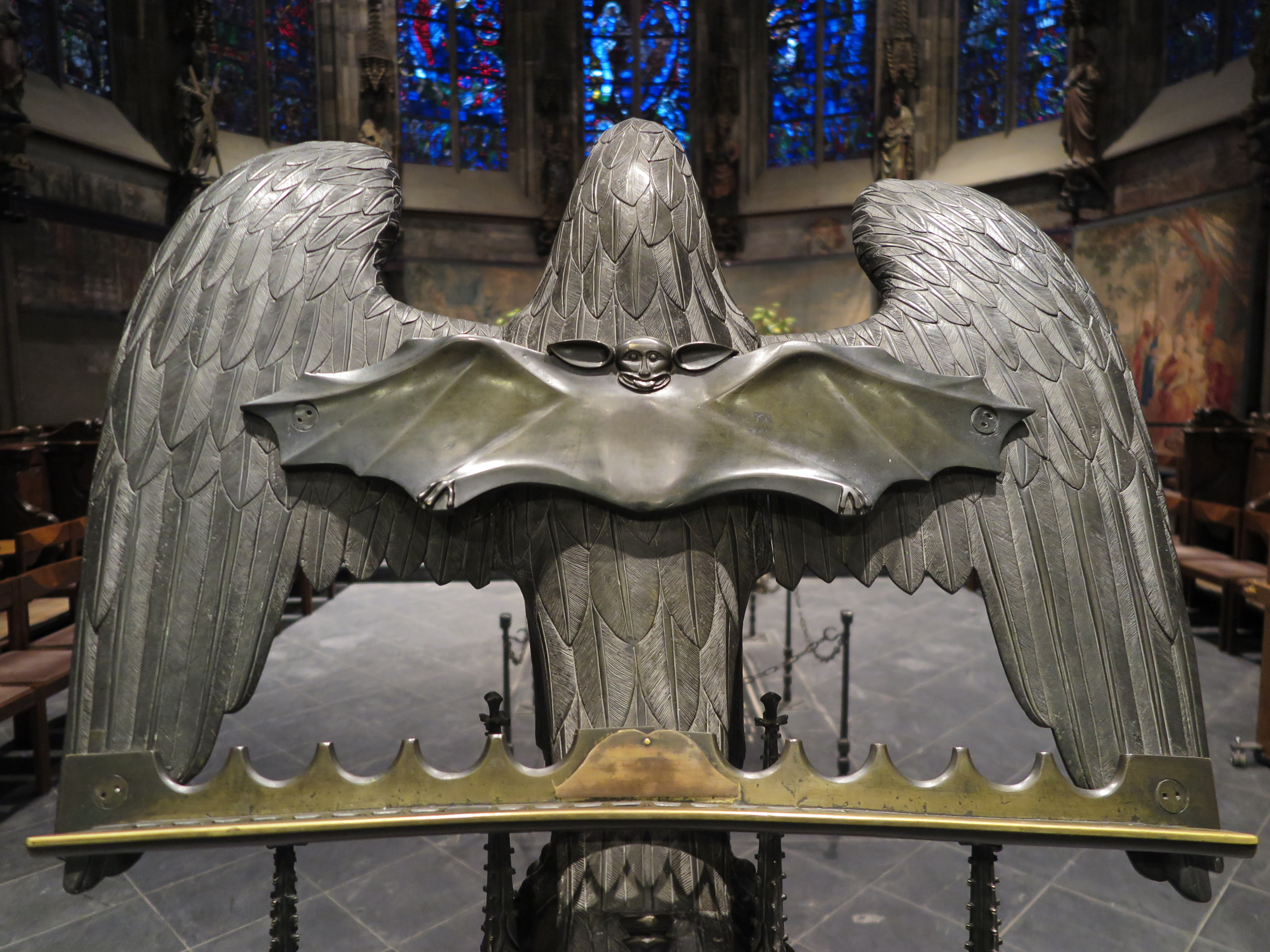
Eagle lectern with bat, 15th century

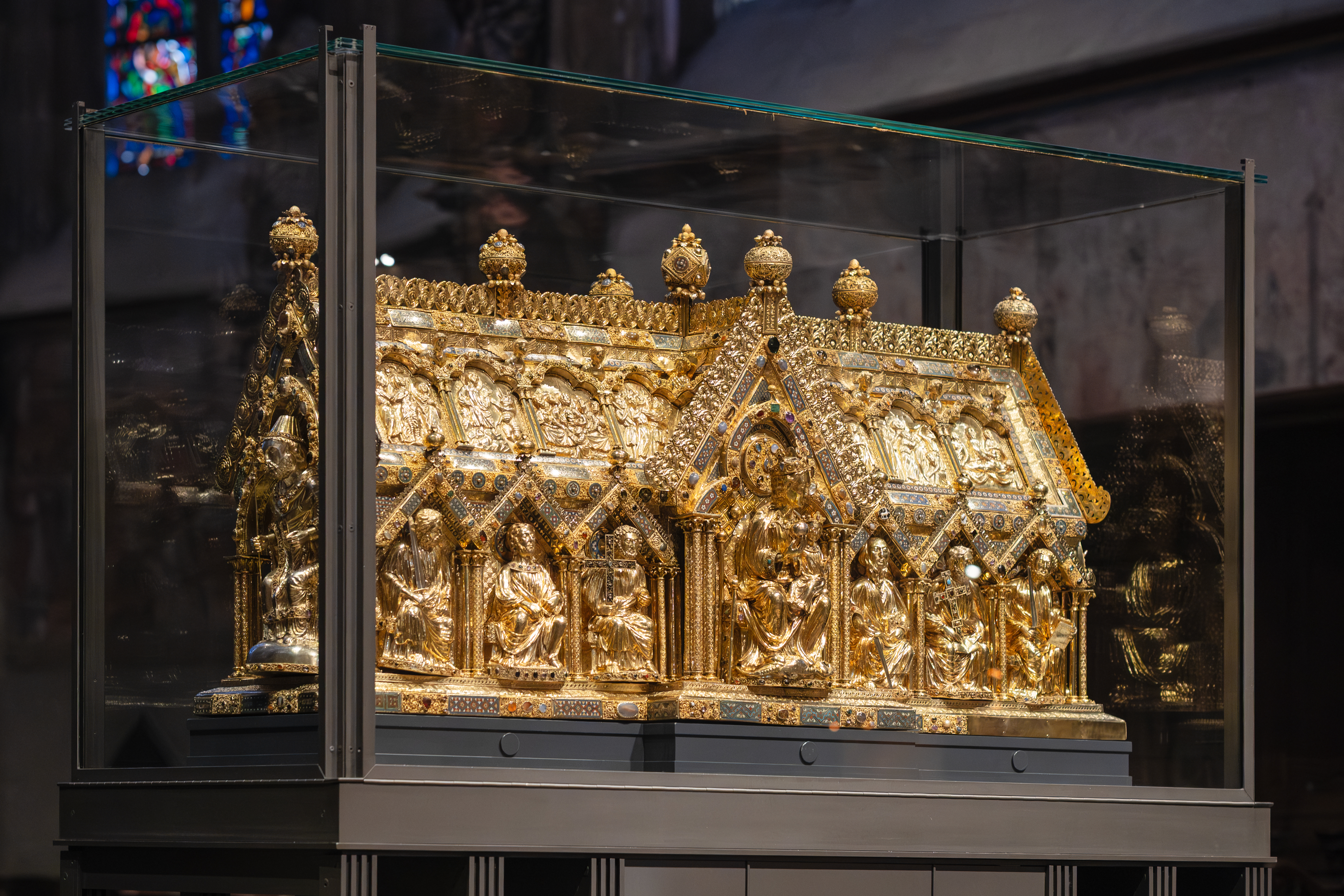
Marienschrein (1238), among the Aachen reliquaries.

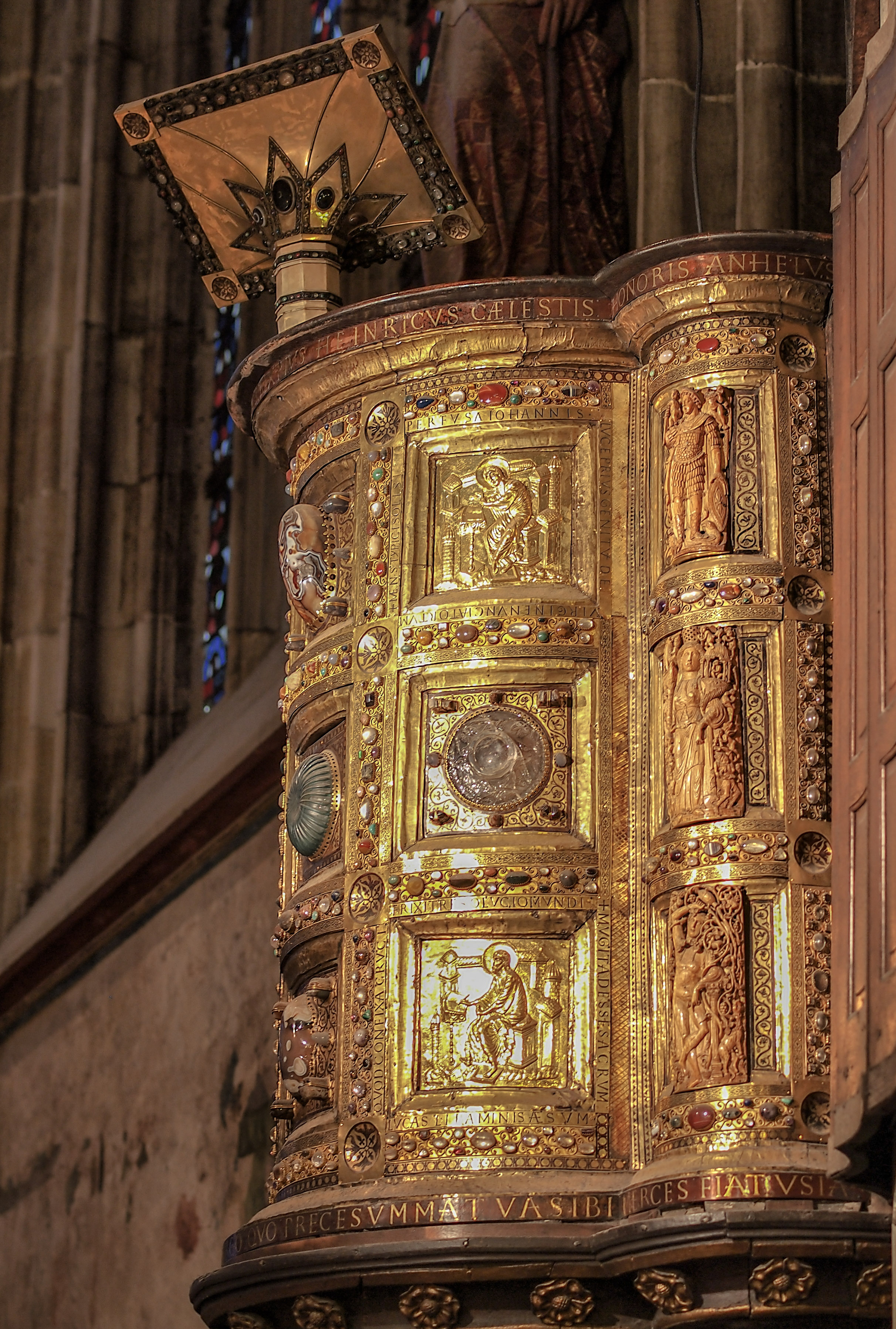
Ambon of Henry II on the south wall of the first choir bay

Choir with illuminated Apostles and Karlsschrein

=== Side chapels ===
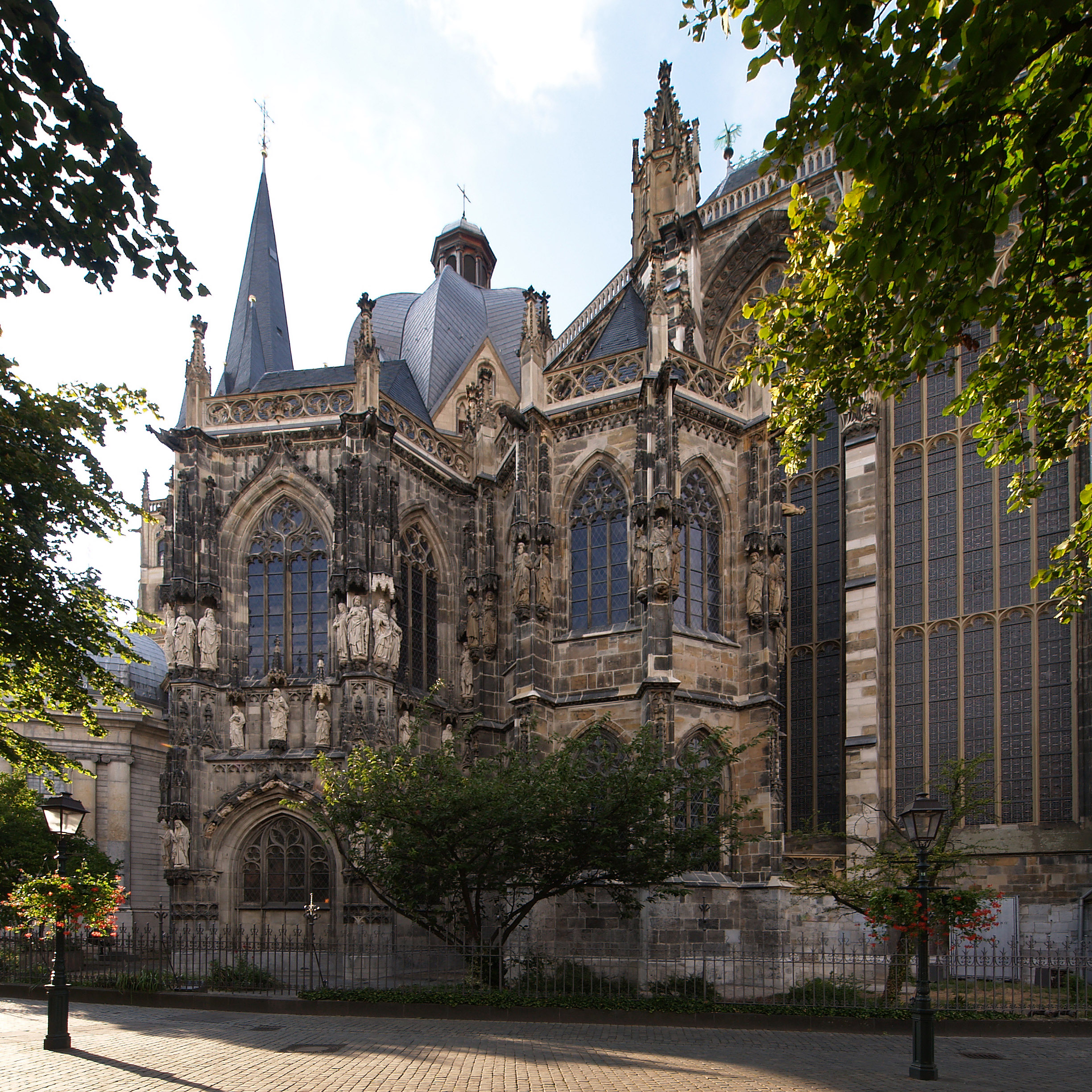
Annakapelle on the left, Matthiaskapelle (Chapel of St Matthew) on the right

Gathered around the octagon are several side chapels. Clockwise from the southeast, they are:

- In the southeast, the Matthiaskapelle (Chapel of St Matthew), which was built in the late 14th century, at the same time as the choir which is next to it.
- Adjoining the Chapel of St Matthew to the south is the gothic Annakapelle (Chapel of St Anne). The lower level of this was originally the narthex to one of the cathedral gates, but later the doors were sealed and the room turned into a chapel.
- South of the western facade is the Chapel of Hungary. Originally a gothic side chapel as well, it was remodelled in the baroque style in the 18th century, following the plans of the Italian architect Joseph Moretti.
- Adjoining the western facade to the north is the Chapel of St Nicholas & St Michael, of the 15th century with a neo-baroque altarpiece in the chancel, created in the 20th century by Joseph Buchkremer. It was formerly the burial place of the canons of Aachen cathedral.
- Northeast, the Chapel of St Charles & Hubert was built into the octagon.
- Further chapels associated with the cathedral complex are found in the cloisters (All Saints and All Souls Chapel) and in the cathedral forecourt (Baptismal Chapel).
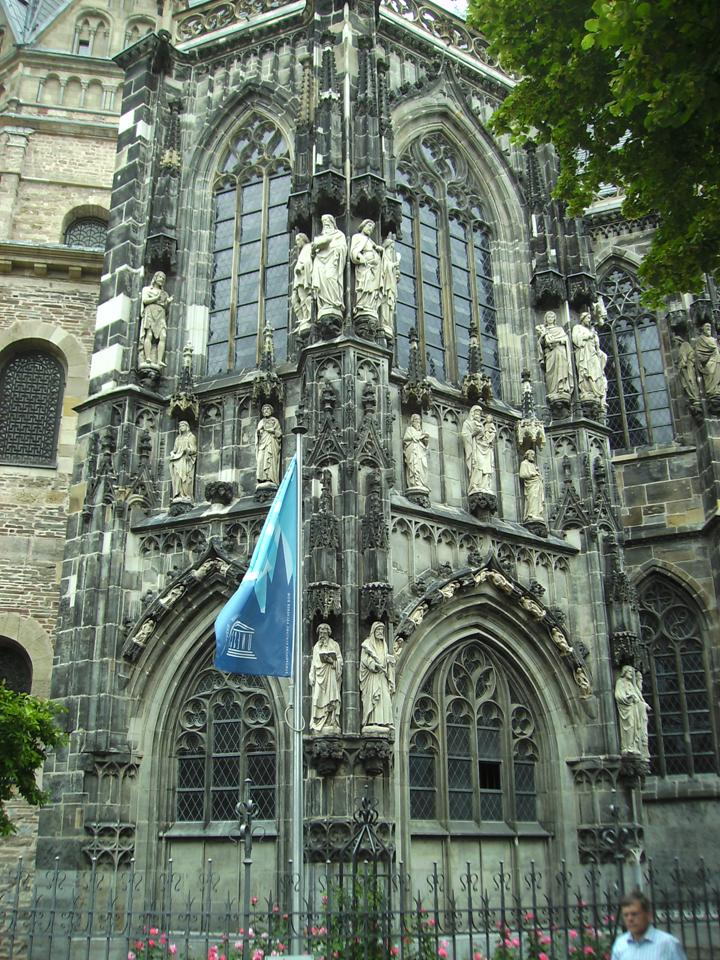
Annakapelle (Chapel of St Anne)

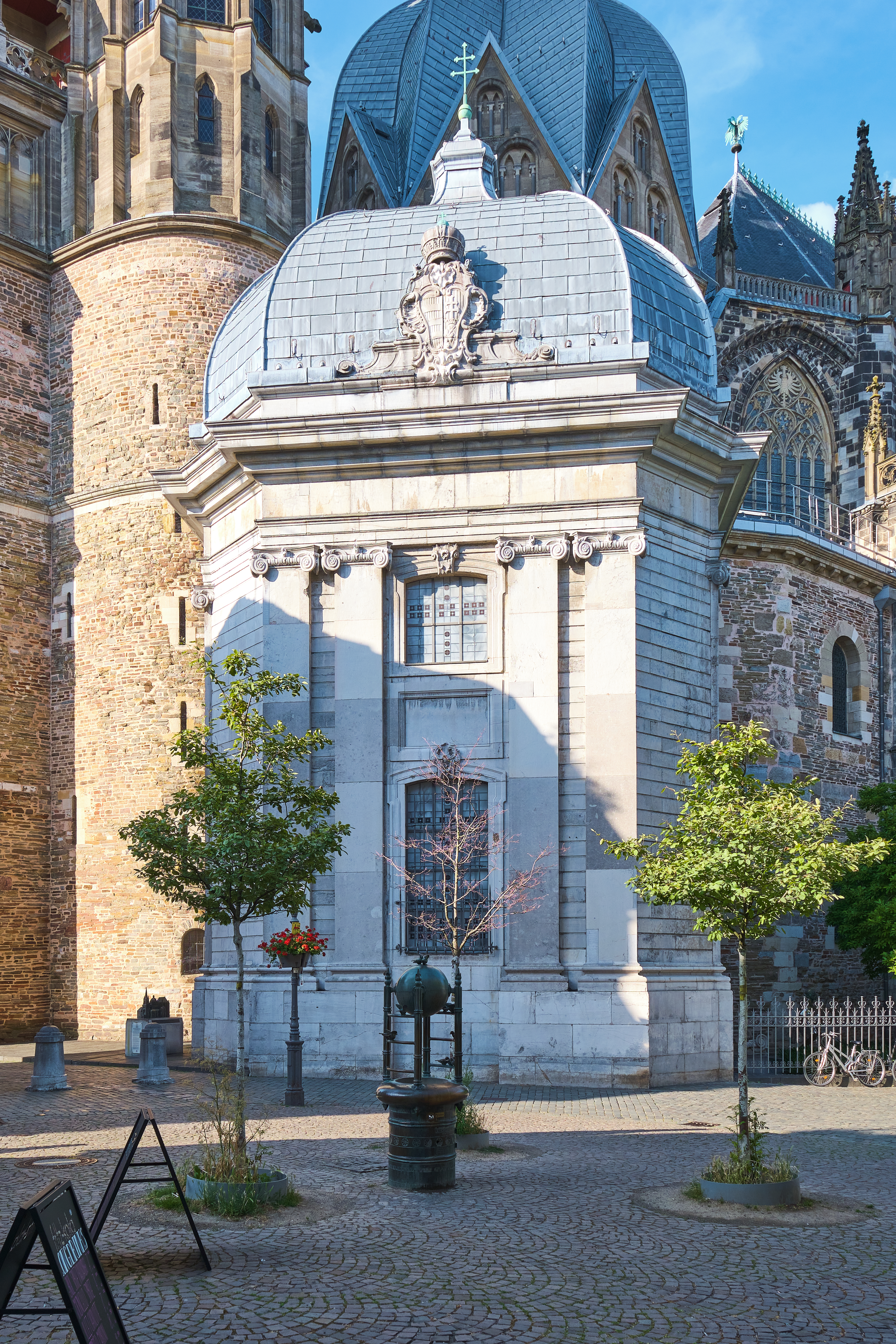
Ungarnkapelle (Chapel of Hungary)

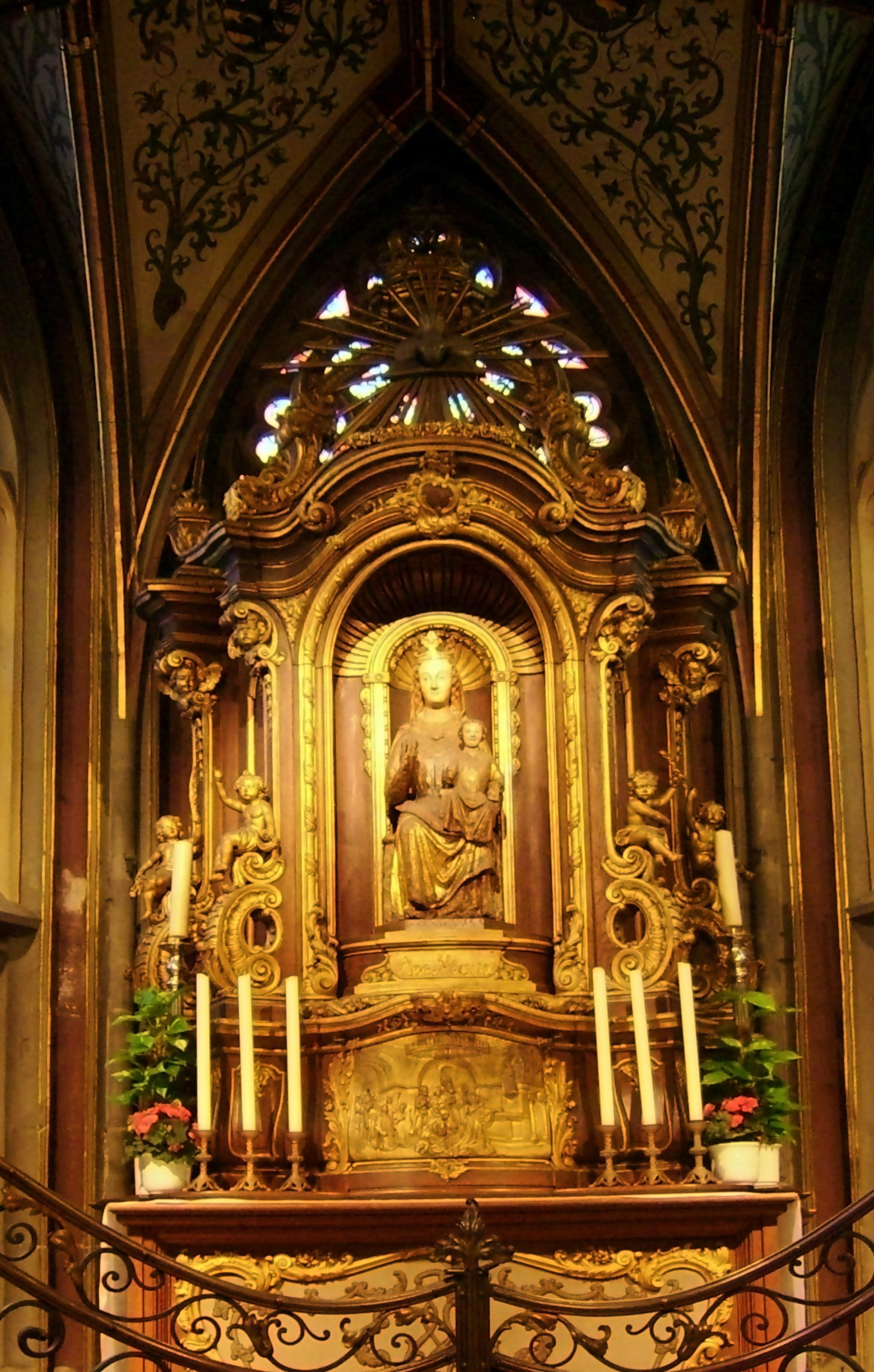
Chancel of the Nikolauskapelle (Chapel of St Nicholas)

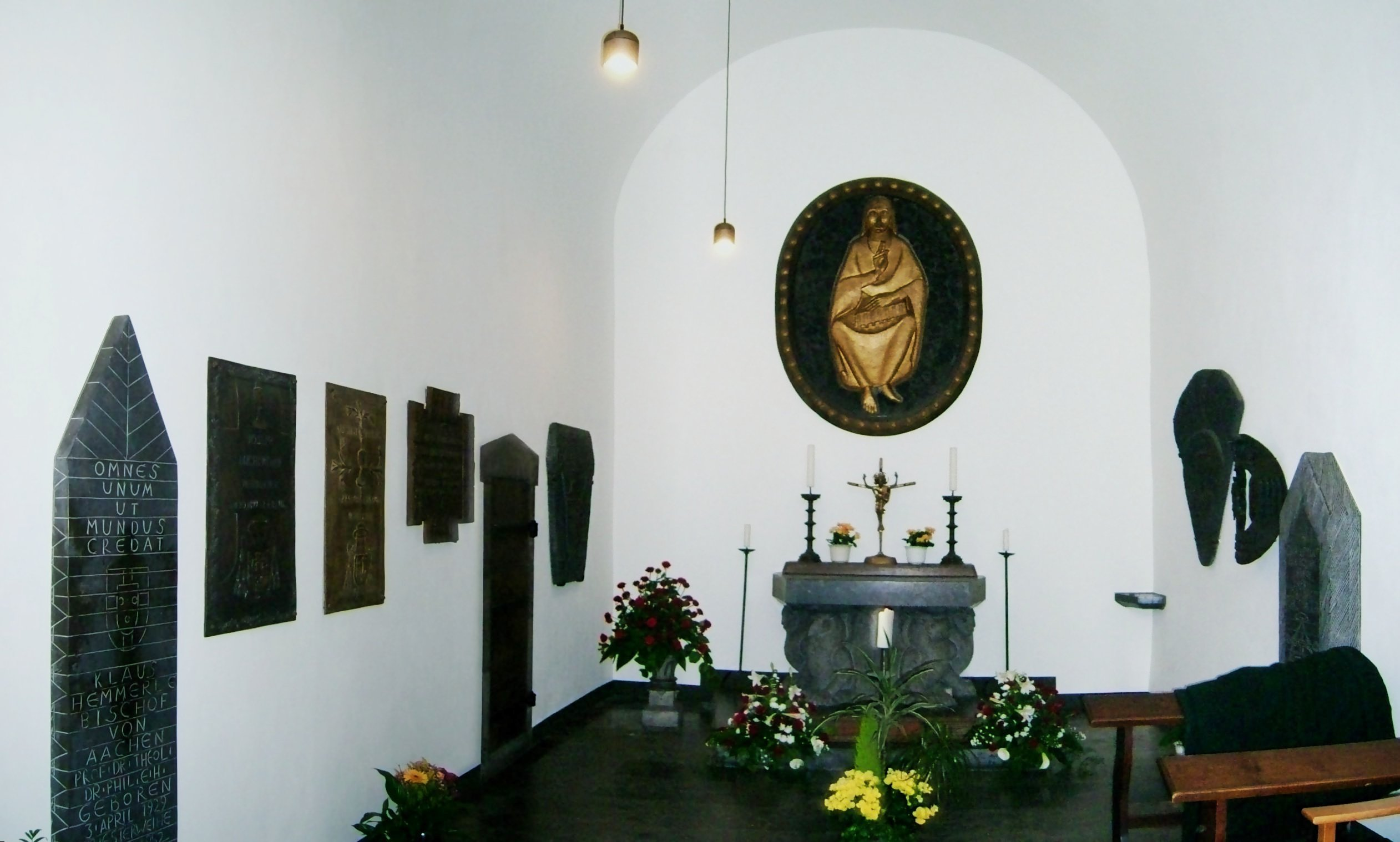
Allerheiligenkapelle (All Saints Chapel)

== Notable items ==
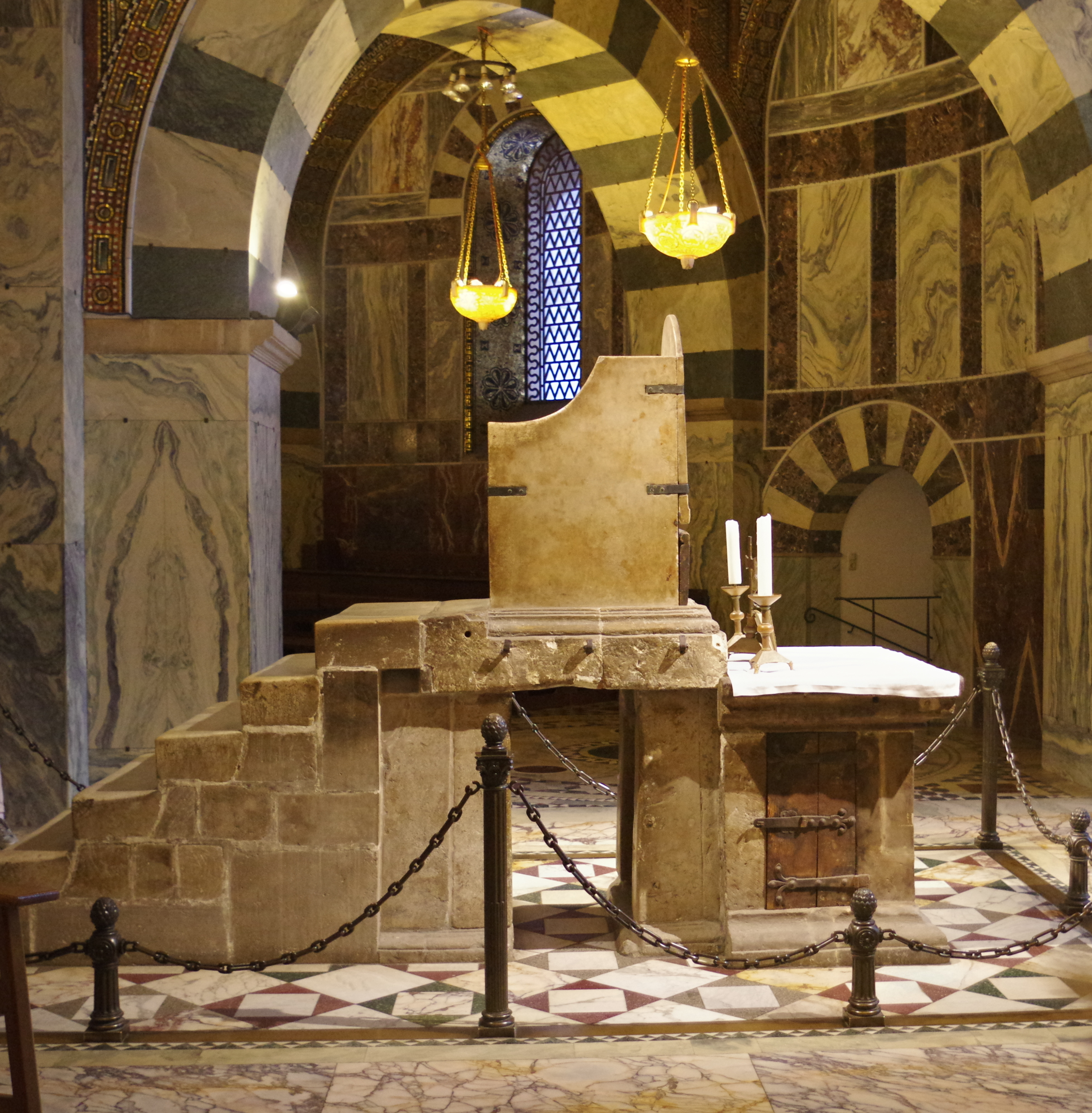
Karlsthron (Throne of Charlemagne)

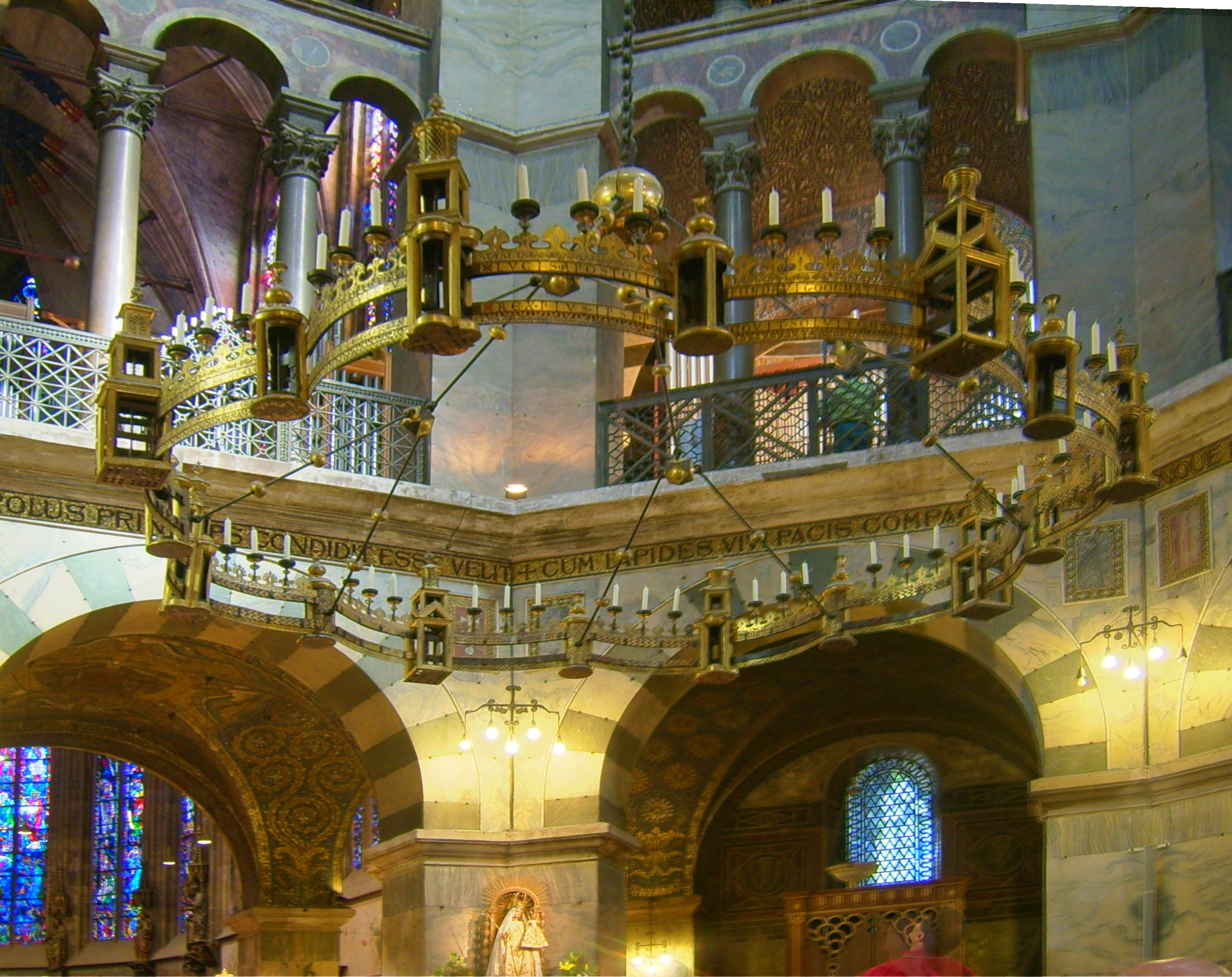
Barbarossa chandelier

Aachen Cathedral houses a collection of medieval art objects from the late Classical, Carolingian, Ottonian and Staufian periods which are exceptional in their artistic and religious meaning.

=== Throne of Charlemagne ===
In the western gallery on the lower floor, opposite the choir, the Throne of Charlemagne is to be found, which has been the object of new investigations in the past decades. The original Carolingian throne came from the spolia of the Church of the Holy Sepulchre in Jerusalem. The appearance of the throne and its location in the Palatine Chapel did not change with the passage of centuries. Between 936 and 1531, thirty one German kings ascended to this throne after their anointment and coronation at the Marienaltar (Altar of Mary).

=== Marienschrein ===
The Marienschrein (Shrine of St. Mary) rests in the choir of the church and dates from 1220 to 1239. Adorned with the figures of Christ, Mary, Charlemagne, Pope Leo III and the Twelve Apostles, the shrine contains the four great Aachen relics: St. Mary's cloak, Christ's swaddling clothes, St. John the Baptist's beheading cloth and Christ's loincloth. Following a custom begun in 1349, every seven years the relics are taken out of the shrine and put on display during the Great Aachen Pilgrimage. This pilgrimage most recently took place during June 2023.

=== Barbarossa chandelier ===
From the vault of the dome, which is made up of eight curved faces, a wheel chandelier hangs on a long chain, about four metres above the ground, with a diameter of over four metres, which is known as the Barbarossa Chandelier (1165/1170). This artwork was a donation of Emperor Frederick Barbarossa and his wife Beatrice. The forty-eight candles of the chandelier are lit for solemnities of the Church.

=== Ambon of Henry II. (Heinrichskanzel) ===
Between 1002 and 1014, Henry II had a pulpit erected as an ambon in the east passage, which is among the most magnificent artistic treasures of the Ottonian Renaissance. Its inscription on the upper and lower edges clearly identifies its donor as Henry II, referring to him as REX PIVS HEINRICVS. The pulpit is made of an oak base and is decorated all over with filigree and precious stones, with many precious artefacts from antiquity, such as four repoussé copper reliefs with depictions of the Evangelists, as well as six ivory panels of the 6th century. The wooden staircase dates to 1782. The Ambon was thoroughly restored in 1816/1817 and again between 1926 and 1937. To this day, the pulpit is still in liturgical use for solemnities of the Church.

=== Pala d'Oro ===
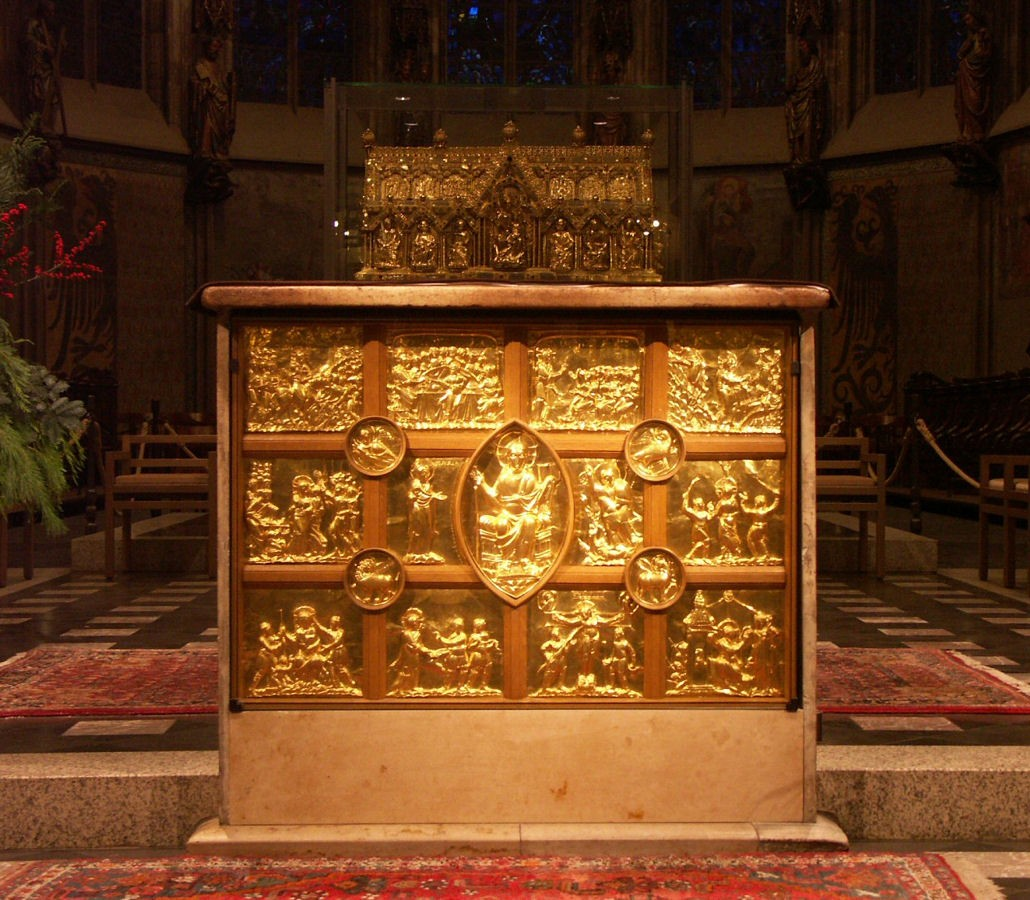
Pala d'Oro

A golden altarpiece, the Pala d'Oro which today forms the Antependium of the high altar was probably created around 1020 in Fulda. It consists of seventeen individual gold panels with reliefs in repoussé. In the centre, Christ is enthroned as Redeemer in a Mandorla, flanked by Mary and the Archangel Michael. Four round medallions with images of the Evangelists' symbols show the connection to the other twelve relief panels with depictions from the life of Jesus Christ. They begin with the entry into Jerusalem and end with the encounter of the women with the risen Christ in front of the open grave on Easter morning. The depictions are read from left to right, like a book.

Stylistically, the Pala d'Oro is not uniform. The first five reliefs probably come from a goldsmith taught in the Rheinland and is distinguished by a strikingly joyful narration. It probably derives from a donation of Emperor Otto III. The other panels, together with the central group of Christ, Mary, and Michael, draws from Byzantine and late Carolingian predecessors and was likely first added under Otto's successor, Henry II, who also donated the Ambo of Henry II.

Presumably, in the late 15th century, the golden altarpiece formed a massive altar system together with the twelve reliefs of apostles in the cathedral treasury, along with altarpieces with scenes from the life of Mary, which would have been dismantled in 1794 as the French Revolutionary troops approached Aachen.

=== Treasury ===
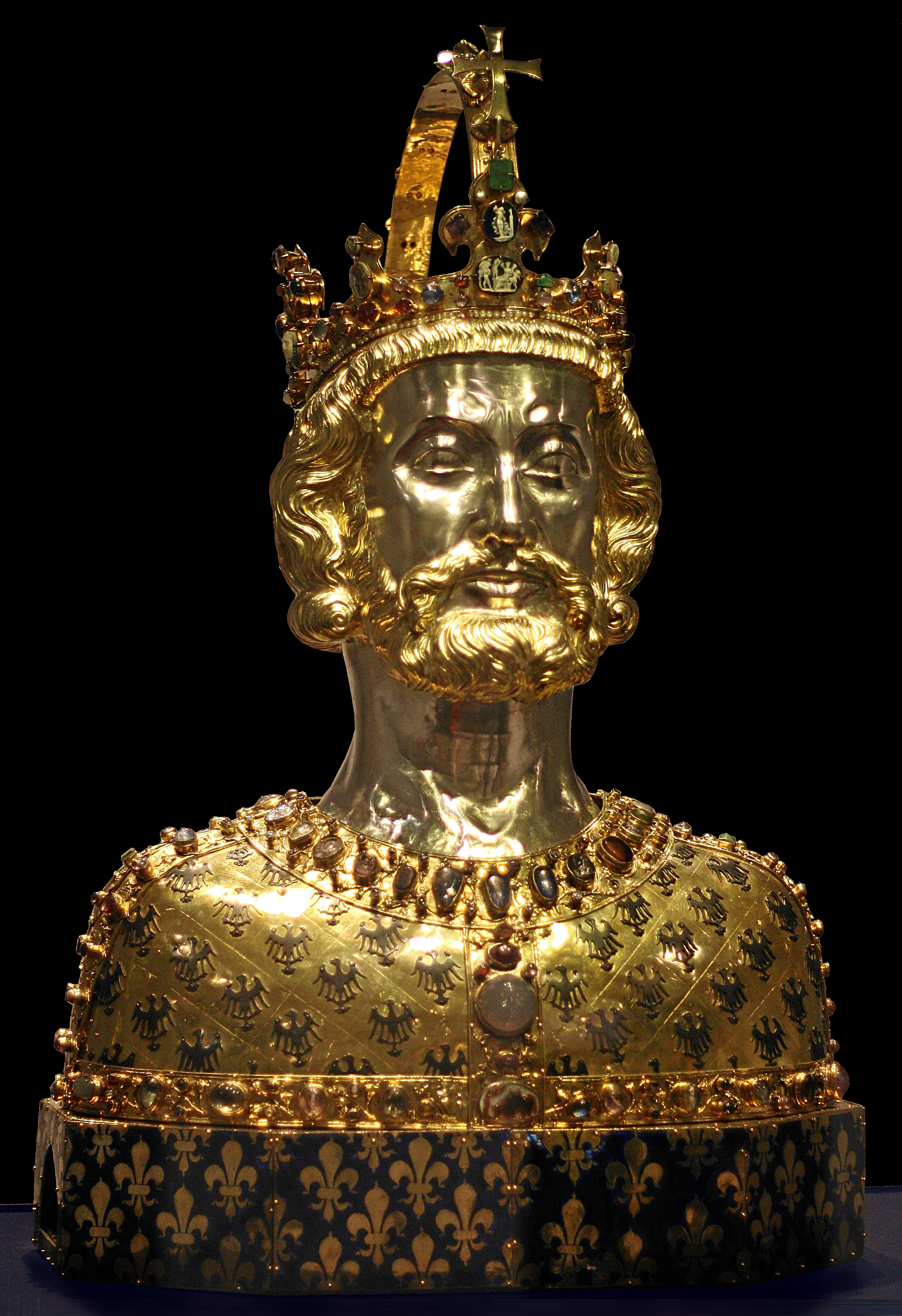
Reliquary bust of Charlemagne (treasury)

The Aachen cathedral treasury includes highly important objects including the Cross of Lothair, Bust of Charlemagne and the Persephone sarcophagus. The Cathedral Treasury in Aachen is regarded as one of the most important ecclesiastical treasuries in northern Europe. Pilgrims are able to see some of the relics every seven years when they are displayed.

=== Organs ===
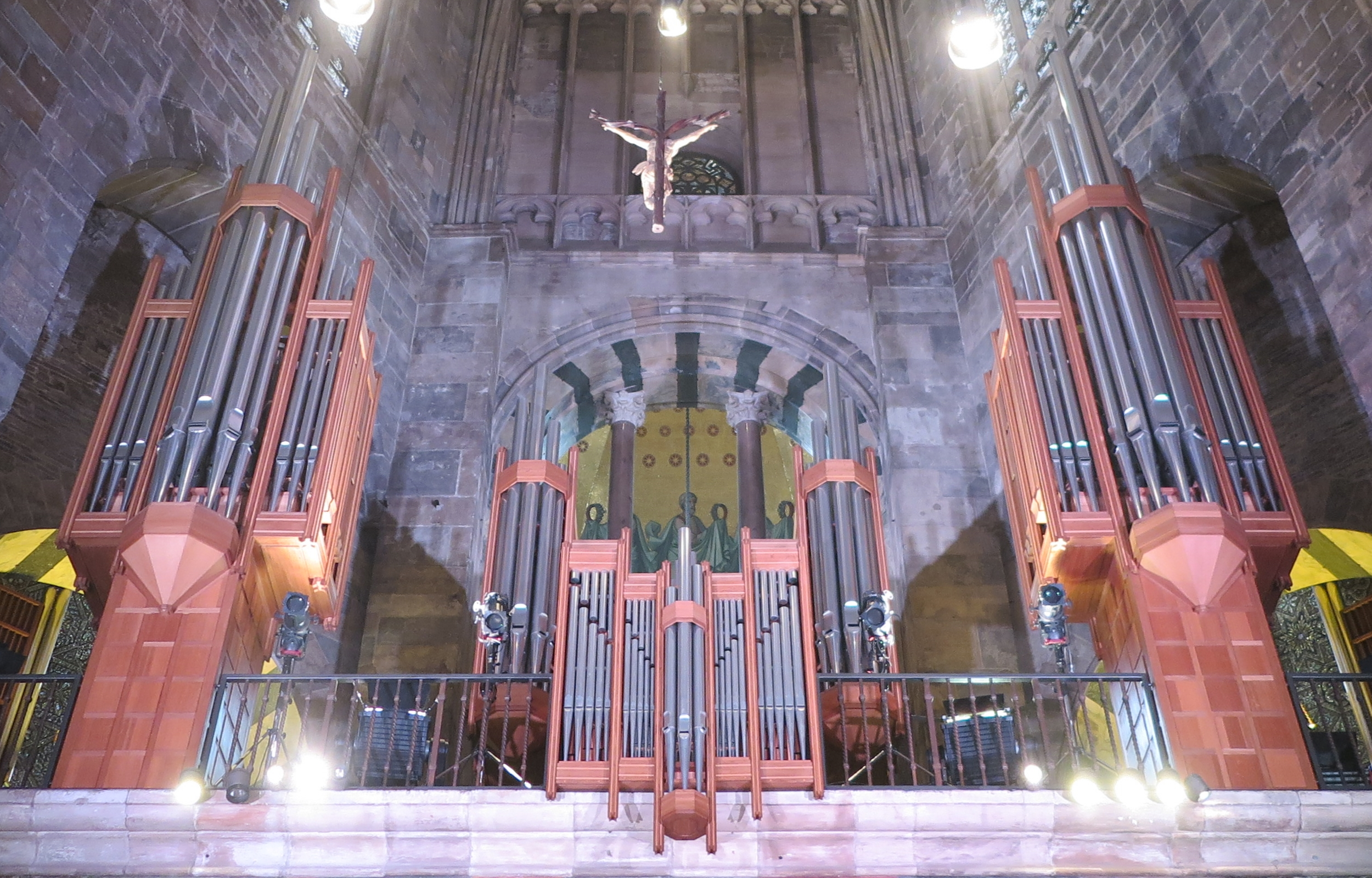
Choir organ

The organ system of Aachen Cathedral was installed in 1939. It consists in part of the earlier organ, installed 1845–1847, which was built by the organ builder Wilhelm Korfmacher of Linnich. This Korfmacher organ had 60 stops, distributed in three works.

The current instrument was installed in 1939 by Johannes Klais (Bonn) and expanded to 65 stops, which were distributed thereafter in five works. To achieve a balanced sound throughout the cathedral, the parts were distributed through the cathedral: in the northwest and southwest niches of the choir are the works of the High organ, while a swallow's nest organ was hung on the east pillar of the octagon.

In 1991–1993, the organ was restored by the Klais organ company and increased to a total of 89 stops. At this time the swallow's nest organ was turned into a new, independent instrument, which now stands in the upper church, between the octagon and the choir.

As well as a chamber organ, the cathedral also has a small organ, called the Zoboli Organ. This was built by the north Italian organ builder, Cesare Zomboli, probably some time around 1850. The pipeworks, windbox, and keyboard survive. The historic housing no longer exists, but the current housing was built later on the model of a north Italian cabinet organ in classicist style. The instrument is arranged in the classic Italian style, with the typical stops of the Roman style as well.

=== Bells ===
The cathedral has eight bells hung on wooden yokes in a wooden bell frame. The bells were cast three years after the city fire of 1656 by Franz Von Trier and his son Jakob. This disposition, altered from that of medieval times, has been maintained to this day, except that the Marybell has had to be replaced twice. The largest bell or bourdon is called "Maria". It weighs over 6 tonnes and was cast in 1958 by Petit & Brothers of Edelbrock. In Germany, the bells are always numbered from largest to smallest, Bell 1 is always the tenor or bourdon.

#	Name	Strike tone (ST-^{1}/_{16})	Weight (kg)	Diameter (mm)	Founder	Dated	Inscription
1	Maria	g^{0} +8	6045	2075	Petit & Gebr. Edelbrock	1958	+ O MATER ALMA CHRISTI CARISSIMA—SUSCIPE PIA LAUDUM PRAECAMINA. (O dearest nourishing mother of Christ, raise praise for our pious hymn); GEGOSSEN 1535 + ZERSTOERT 1656 + ERNEUERT 1659 + ZERBORSTEN 1818 + UMGEGOSSEN 1881 + ZERSCHLAGEN 1942 + WIEDERUM ERNEUERT 1958 (Cast 1535 + Destroyed 1656 + Restored 1659 + Disrupted 1818 + Recast 1881 + Obliterated 1942 + Restored again 1958)
2	Carolus	h^{0} +7	2900	1628	Franz and Jakob von Trier	1659	HONOR ET CULTUS, QUEM REGALIS ECCLESIA AQUEN: SANCTISSIMO IMPERATORI PATRONO AC FUNDATORI SUO CAROLO VIRTUTE, MERITO, IMPERIO VERE MAGNO DEBET ET DEFERT MIHI NOMEN DEDIT ANNO 1 6 5 9 (The honour and devotion, which the royal church of Aachen owes and renders to its most sacred Emperor, patron and benefactor: Charles, truly Great in virtue, merit and rule, gave this name to me in the year 1659).
3	Johannes Evangelista	d^{1} +8	1400	1367	"""	1659	NASCENTES INTER SOCIAS MECUM ORDINE PONOR TERTIA, SED CUM QUINTA TONO APPELLATA JOHANNES (I am placed third in order among the friends born with me, but I call to John with the fifth tone)
4	Johannes Baptista	e^{1} +7	1225	1217	"""	1659	JOHANNES BAPTISTA ORA PRO NOBIS. IN LUDO HAUD IN AGRO FLORENS NOS CURIA FECIT SED LONGO SUB AGRO FUDIT NOS IPSE DECANO. An O. 1 6 5 6 (John the Baptist pray for us. Flourishing in play not in the field, the Curia made us, but cast us in a vast field for the dean. 1656)
5	Leopardus	fis^{1} +3	850	1078	"""	1659	SANCTE LEOPARDE ORA PRO NOBIS ANNO 1 6 5 9 (Saint Leopardus pray for us. Made 1659.)
6	Stephanus	g^{1} +8	715	1027	"""	1659	SANCTE STEPHANE ORA PRO NOBIS ANNO 1 6 5 9 (St Stephen pray for us. Made 1659.)
7	Petrus	a^{1} +1	425	894	"""	1659	SANCTE PETRE ORA PRO NOBIS ANNO 1 6 5 9 (St. Peter pray for us. Made 1659.)
8	Simeon	h^{1} +8	290	793	"""	1659	SANCTE SIMEON JUSTE ET TIMORATE ORA PRO NOBIS (St Simon, just and devout, pray for us)

== Historical and religious significance ==
=== Final resting place of Charlemagne ===
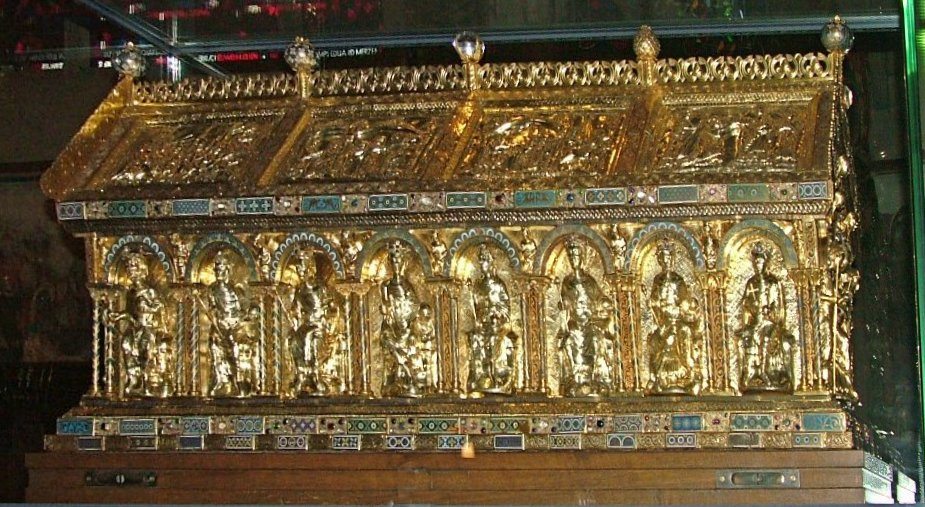
Shrine of Charlemagne (1215)

The core of Aachen Cathedral, the Carolingian octagon, was originally erected as Charlemagne's palace chapel and was also his grave. After his death, on 28 January 814, he was buried in his church; the exact spot is unknown, because of the lack of documentation and the ambiguity of the physical evidence. However, it is probable that he was buried in the Persephone sarcophagus under the west tower at the entrance to the octagon.

In 1000, Otto III had Charlemagne's vault opened. Otto of Lomello, one of the courtiers who accompanied him, recorded the event, which is reported in the Chronicle of Novalesia, written about 1026. The account reads:

So we went in to Charles. He did not lie, as the dead otherwise do, but sat as if he were living. He was crowned with a golden crown and held in his gloved hands a sceptre; the fingernails had penetrated through the gloves and stuck out. Above him was a canopy of limestone and marble. Entering, we broke through this. Upon our entrance, a strong smell struck us. Kneeling, we gave Emperor Charles our homage, and put in order the damage that had been done. Emperor Charles had not lost any of his members to decay, except only the tip of his nose. Emperor Otto replaced this with gold, took a tooth from Charles's mouth, walled up the entrance to the chamber, and withdrew again.

A large picture representing Otto and his nobles gazing on the dead Emperor was painted on the wall of the great room in Aachen Town Hall.

In 1165, on the occasion of Charlemagne's canonisation, Emperor Frederick Barbarossa again opened the vault and reinterred his remains. In 1215, at his coronation, Frederick II had the remains reinterred for the last time, placing them in a casket of gold and silver, known as the Karlsschrein, where they remain to this day.

Emperor Otto III was buried in the cathedral as well.

=== Coronation church of German kings ===
On the explicit instructions of Charlemagne, his son Louis the Pious crowned himself king in the chapel. Between the coronation of Otto I in 936 and 1531, thirty German kings (out of ~40) were crowned in the chapel. The coronation itself occurred at the High Altar, followed by the enthronement on the Aachen Throne of Charlemagne (which can still be seen today). It is also notable that in this period, all German rulers, regardless of whether they were crowned in Aachen or not, took their position on Charlemagne's throne.

=== Aachen pilgrimage ===
The Aachen pilgrimage (Aachener Heiligtumsfahrt), a pilgrimage during which the four most important religious relics of the cathedral can be seen by believers, is attested from 1238. Since 1349, these relics have been displayed once every seven years. The last pilgrimage was in 2023, and had the motto "Discover Me".

== Influence ==
As early as the Middle Ages, Aachen Cathedral was admired and imitated, as in the case of Essen Minster, the Old Tower in Mettlach and in the Alsatian Abbey Church of Ottmarsheim. Construction elements of the octagon and choir were nominated as Historic landmarks of German civil engineering in 2007.

== Chronology ==
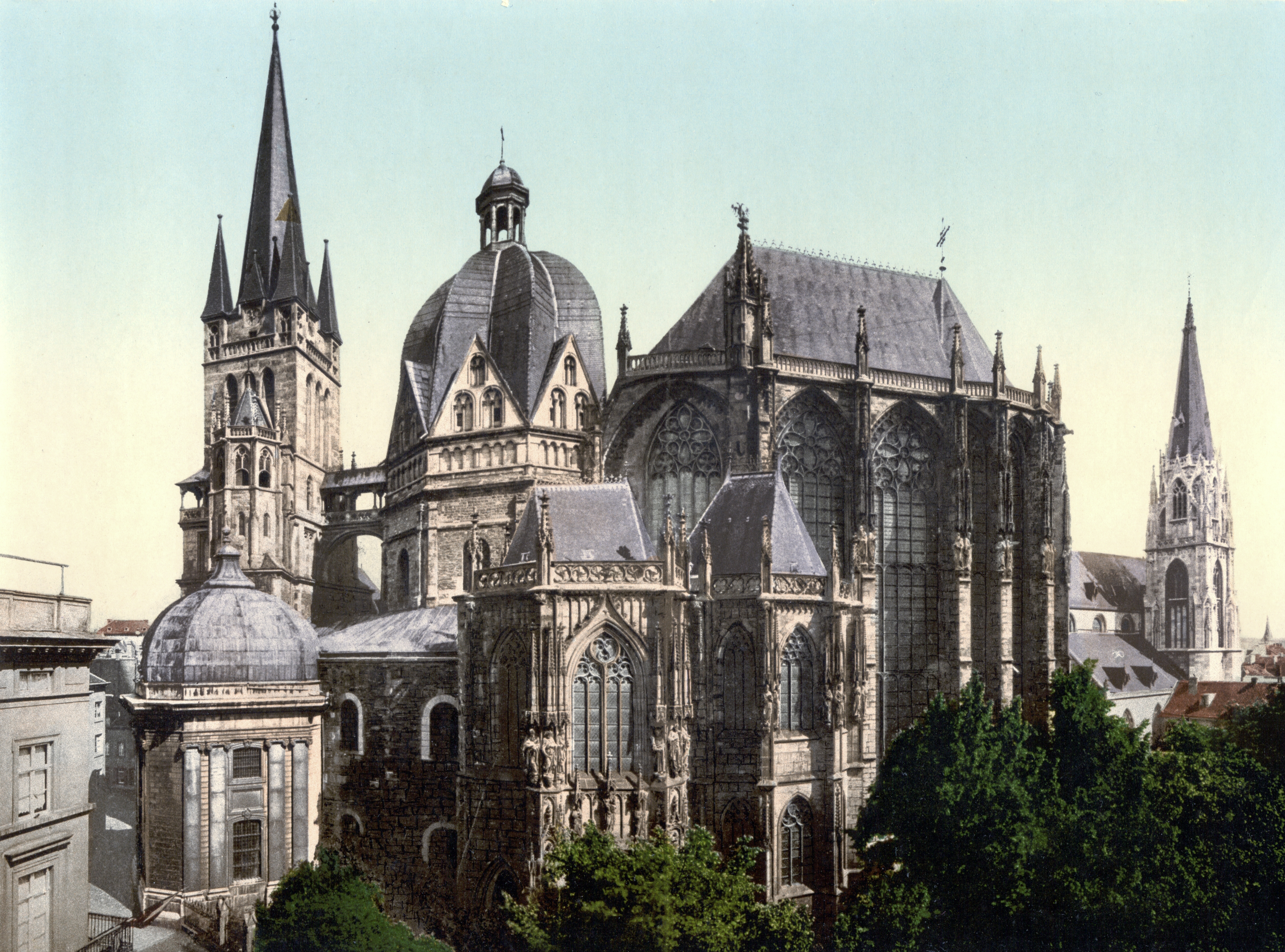
Aachen Cathedral c. 1900

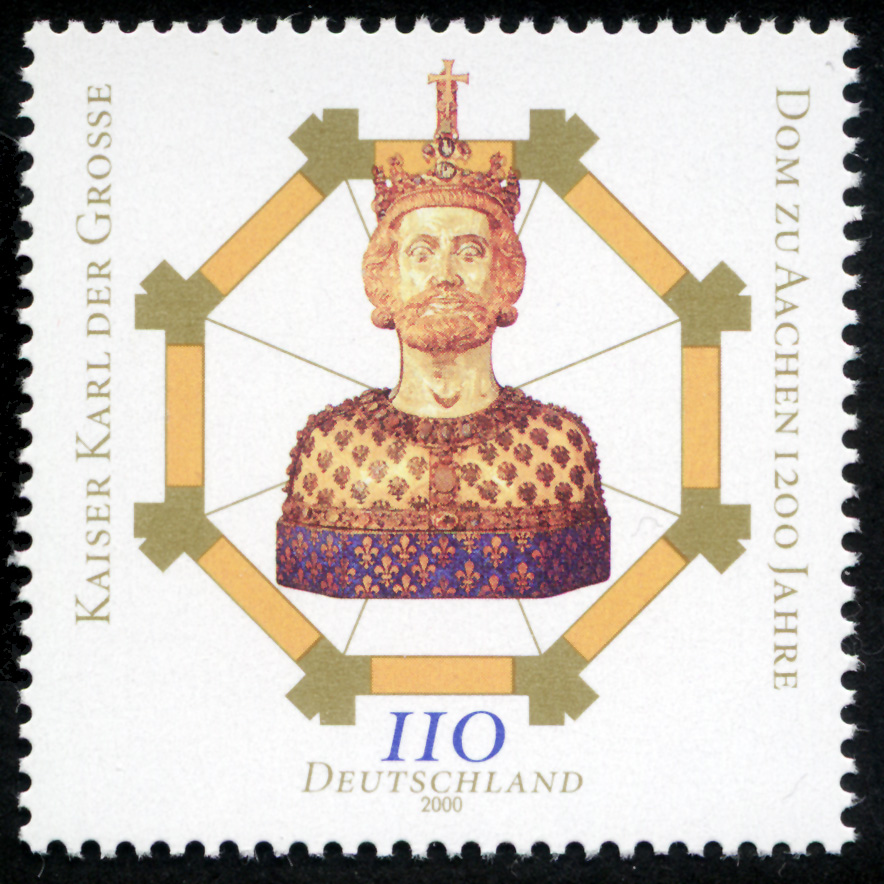
To celebrate 1200 Years of Aachen Cathedral in 2000, the Federal Republic of Germany issued these commemorative stamps.

- 768–800: Aachen was the residence of Charlemagne. Construction of the palace (in the location of the modern Rathaus and Aachen Cathedral) on the site of a Roman bath. The Octagon was built with columns and marble from ancient buildings of Rome, Ravenna, Trier & Cologne). The exterior was covered with red plaster. This central core was begun in 793 at the earliest and finished by 813 at the latest. This dating was reached in 2009 by means of dendrochronology on wood in the structure, which was found during repairs to the cathedral.
- 805: Consecration by Pope Leo III.
- 814: Funeral of Charlemagne in the Palatine chapel, exact location unknown.
- 936: Coronation of Otto I in the Palatine Chapel.
- 997: Otto III ordered the walls of the Palatine chapel painted.
- 1002: Otto III buried in the Octagon.
- 1002–1014: Henry II donates the Ambon of Henry II.
- 1152–1190: Frederick I donates the Barbarossa chandelier.
- 1165: Canonization of Charlemagne
- 1187–1193: Erection of the romanesque cloister, expansion of the octagon around the blind arcade.
- c.1240/1250: Erection of the gable of the Octagon, collapse of the window in the west niche, the building received a white replacement (perhaps earlier, in 1187–1193), the gable was painted colorfully.
- c.1350: Addition of the west towen, in the Gothic style, with a tall pyramidal roof spire and two flanking towers, bridge to the Octagon for the display of relics.
- 1367: Gothic predecessor to the modern Chapel of Hungary.
- 1355–1414: Erection of the choir, simultaneous with the erection of the Chapel of St Matthew, whose date of consecration is not preserved (possible dates range between 1379 (completion of the foundations) and 1420).
- c.1420: Statues on pillars in the choir made from Baumberg limestone.
- 1429: Double door of the narthex (broken 1811, remains in the cathedral court, on the south wall with gothic graffiti in red chalk).
- 1449: Chapel of St Anne added, initially as an open hall on the lower floor, rebuilt in the baroque style in 1772, renewed in 1862 with gothic masonry.
- 1456–1474: The two-level Chapel of St Charles and St Hubert.
- before 1487: Nikolauskapelle (Chapel of St Nicholas). Further gothic chapel buildings were planned, but were never built.
- 1656: Fire of Aachen, extensive destruction to the city. The cathedral's entire roof was destroyed.
- 1664: New roof on the octagon and choir. Octagon reaches modern form ("Lemon squeezer").
- 1719–1733: Baroquification with the application of stucco to the inner rooms by Johann Baptist Atari, painting of the vault, baroque reworking of the main window, expansion of the choir window tracery.
- 1748–1767: Construction of the Chapel of Hungary.
  - 1755: Destruction of the shell of the previous chapel by Johann Joseph Couven due to structural defects.
  - 1756–1767: Construction of new building according to the plans of Joseph Moretti.
- 1788: Entrance porch in front of the west facade, resulting in the internalisation of the Carolingian bronze door (Wolfstür).
- 1794: Occupation of the city by French revolutionary troops, removal of the columns to Paris (some of which are still in the Louvre), dismantling of the lead roof (replaced with slate in 1803), temporary use of the cathedral as a stable.
- 1814: Aachen becomes part of Kingdom of Prussia.
- 1832: Beginning of restoration works.
- 1843: Reinstallation of some of the columns (28 pieces returned from France) in the Octagon, several columns replaced with new ones, the old bronze bases replaced with marble, almost all of the ten capitals returned from France replaced in marble.
- 1847: Foundation of the Karlsverein (Charlemagne Society).
- 1849–1861: Repair of the choir and its fittings, restoration of the tracery at the instigation of the glassworker with five webs (the gothic tracery has six webs).
- 1857–1862: Restoration of the Chapel of St Anne.
- 1864–1866: Restoration of the Chapel of St Matthew.
- 1868: Restoration of the Chapel of St Charles & St Hubert.
- 1866–1873: Statues added to the Chapel of St Matthew in Uldfangen limestone and to the Chapel of St Charles & St Hubert, Chapel of St Anne & the choir in Savonnières limestone by Gottfried Götting.
- 1869–1873: Removal of baroque decoration and exterior plaster, producing the modern bare stone. By 1871, the complete renovation of the Staufen gable, Medieval material being retained only in the roof of the choir.
- 1879–1884: Neogothic addition to the west tower, in pursuit of the tower's gothic form.
- 1879–1881: Decoration of the cupola with mosaic, according to the plans of the Belgian Béthune, carried out by the Venetian mosaicist Antonio Salviatis.
- 1896–1902: Marble cladding and mosaic decoration of the passages according to the plans of Hermann Schaper from Hannover, carried out by Puhl & Wagner of Rixdorf (Berlin).
- 1913: Marble floors in the Octagon and the passages.
- 1949–1951: Restoration of the choir windows which had been destroyed in the Second World War, by Walter Benner and Anton Wendling.
- 1986–2011: Massive programme of restorations to Aachen Cathedral. Exterior renovations were completed in 2006, interior & basement renovations were completed in 2011, with the cleaning and conservation of the mosaics in the Octagon. According to the cathedral's architect, Maintz, around €35 million were spent in the course of the programme.

== Legend ==
According to legend, the people of Aachen ran out of funding to finish the construction of the cathedral. It is said that they made a deal with the devil to obtain the remaining funds, in exchange for the soul of the first to enter the cathedral. Upon completion, the locals sent a wolf into the cathedral and the devil quickly took the animal's soul. Upon realizing the trick, the devil stormed from the cathedral, severing his thumb in the lion head door handles. A wolf statue sits in the entrance to the cathedral, and the "devil's thumb" can be felt inside the lion's mouth.

== Miscellaneous ==
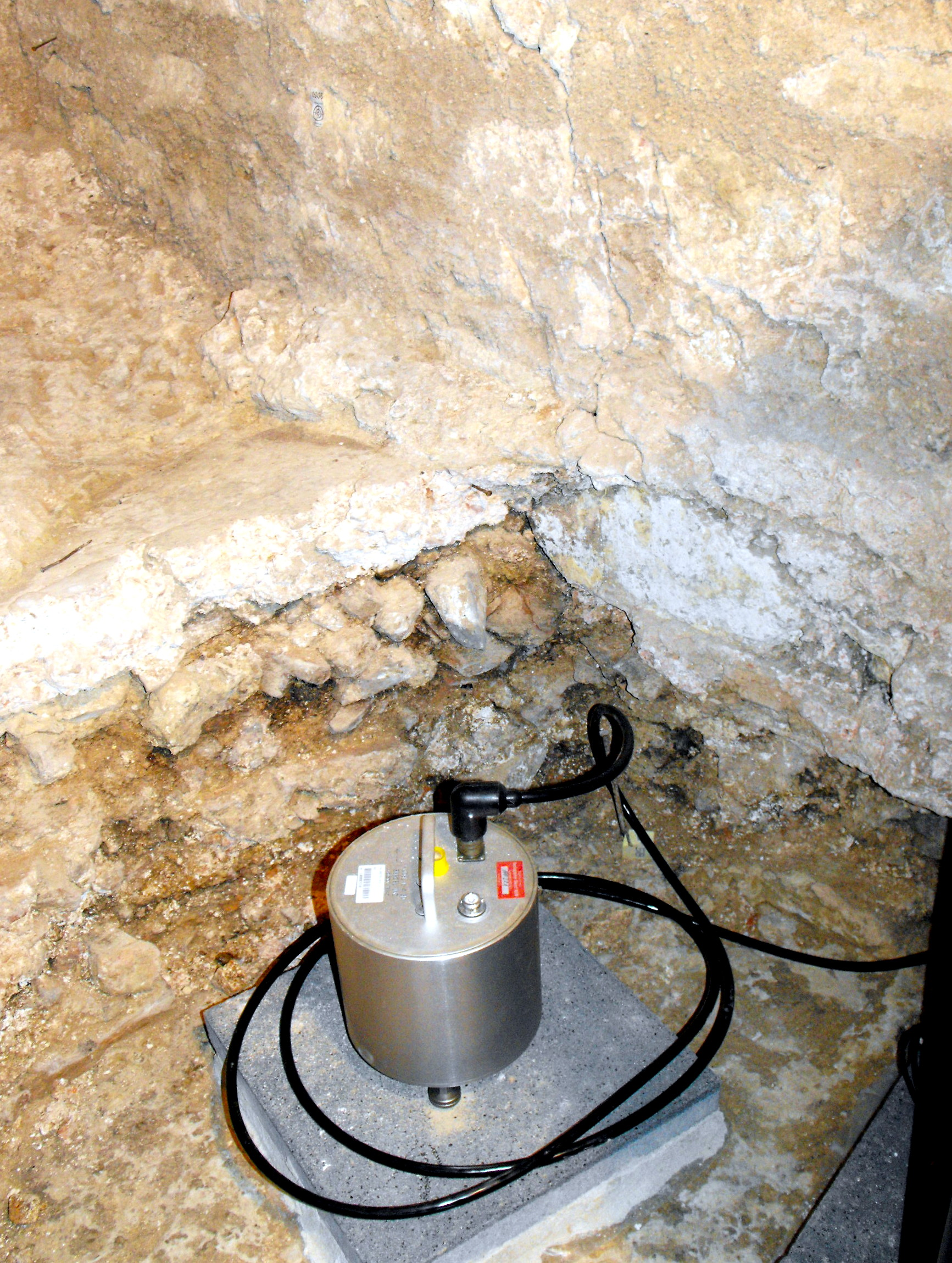
Seismometer of the seismological station in Aachen Cathedral

- The German impressionist painter August von Brandis painted Aachen Cathedral in several works. Act III of Giuseppe Verdi's Ernani is set at the tomb of Charlemagne.
- Shade of Hungarian chapel in the garden of the cathedral is the statue of Saint Stephen by Imre Varga, made in 1993.
- The Domwache (Cathedral watch), a youth self-help group, has been operated since 1957 by the Catholic students association of K.D.St.V. Franconia Aachen.
- Since 15 November 2012, the Geological Service of North Rhine-Westphalia operates a station monitoring seismic activity in the Lower Rhine Basin. It is located in the foundations of the hexadecagon near the entry to the St Ann's Chapel.

== Gallery ==
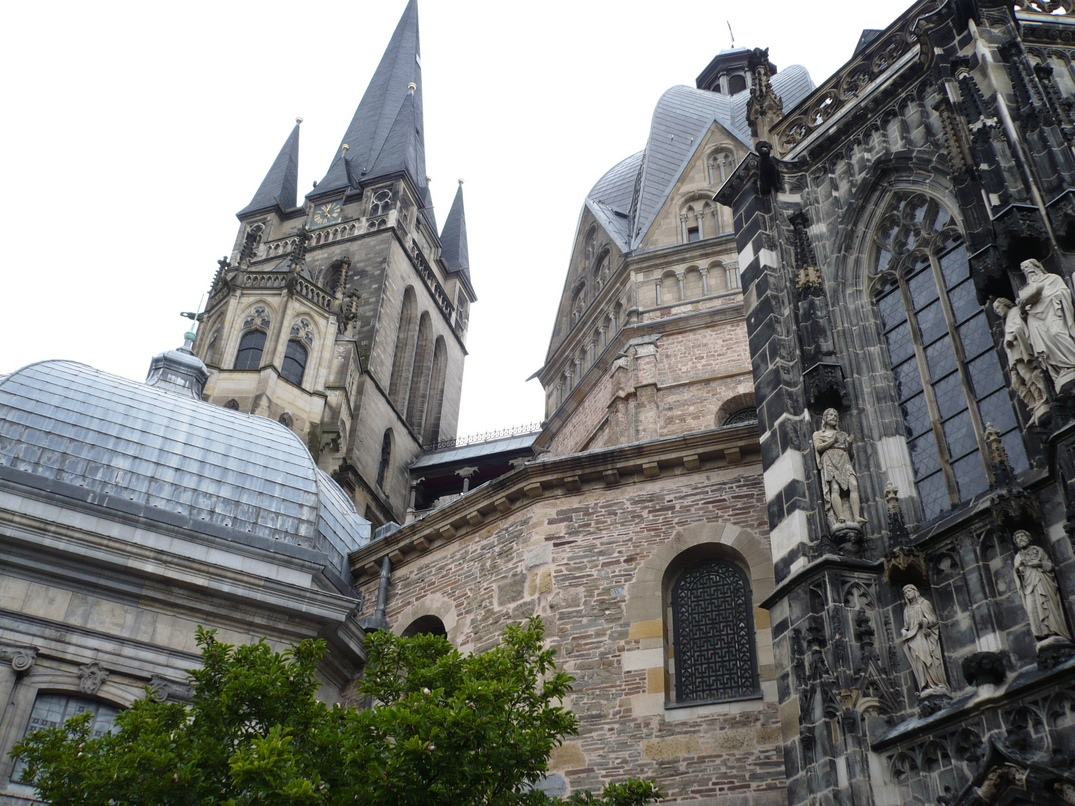
Cathedral exterior

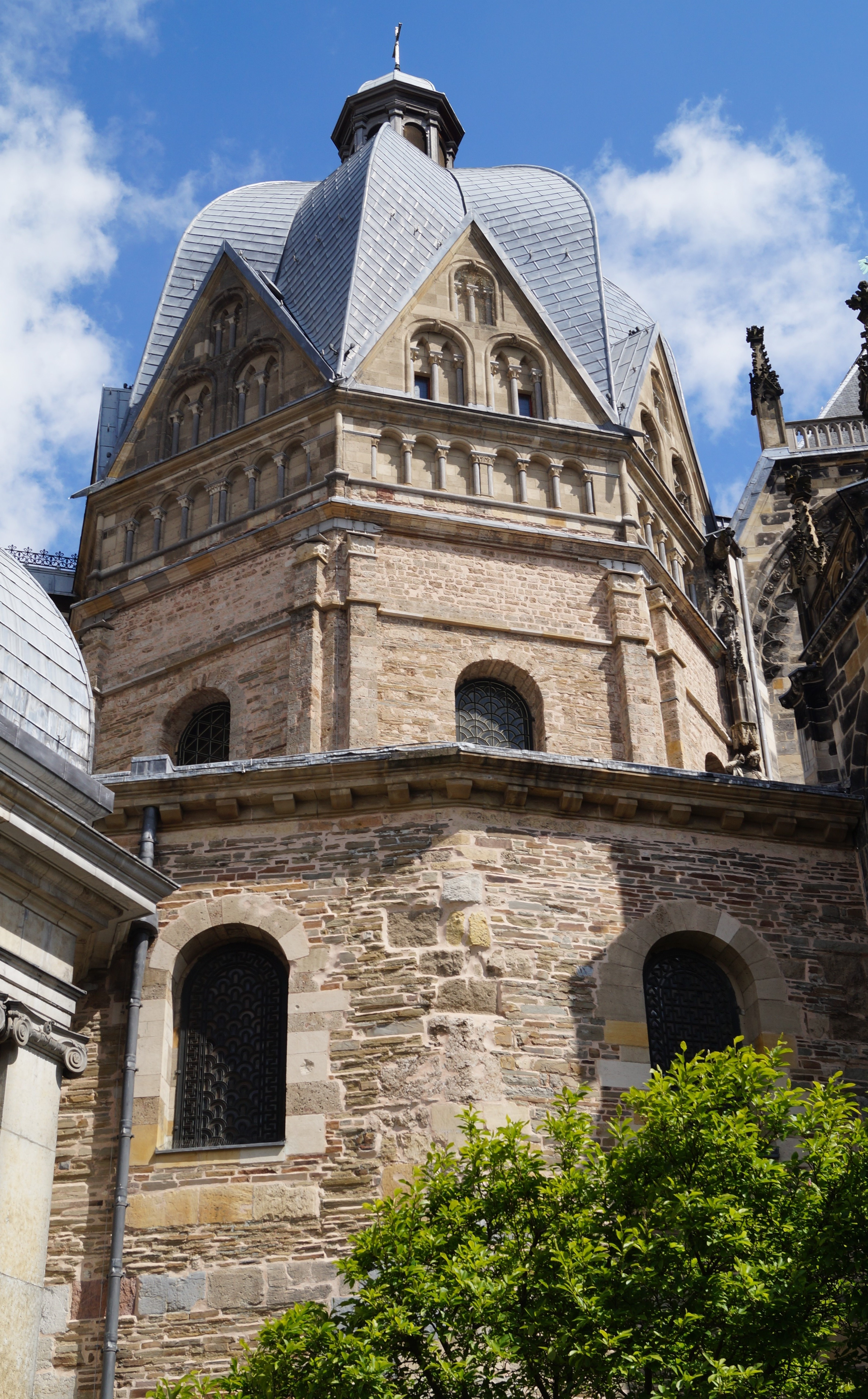
Exterior of the Palatine Chapel

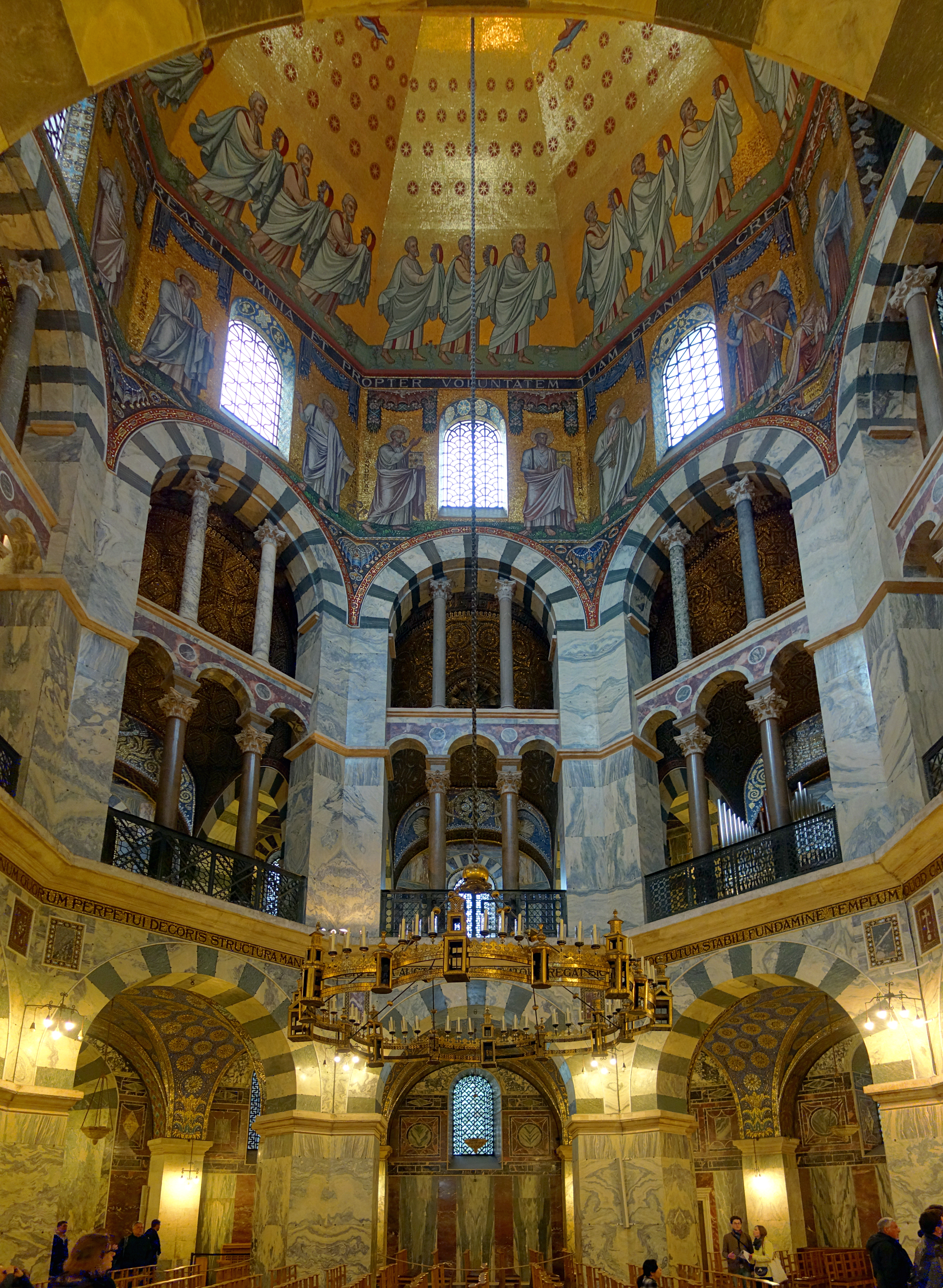
Interior of the Palatine Chapel

View from the Octagon into the choir

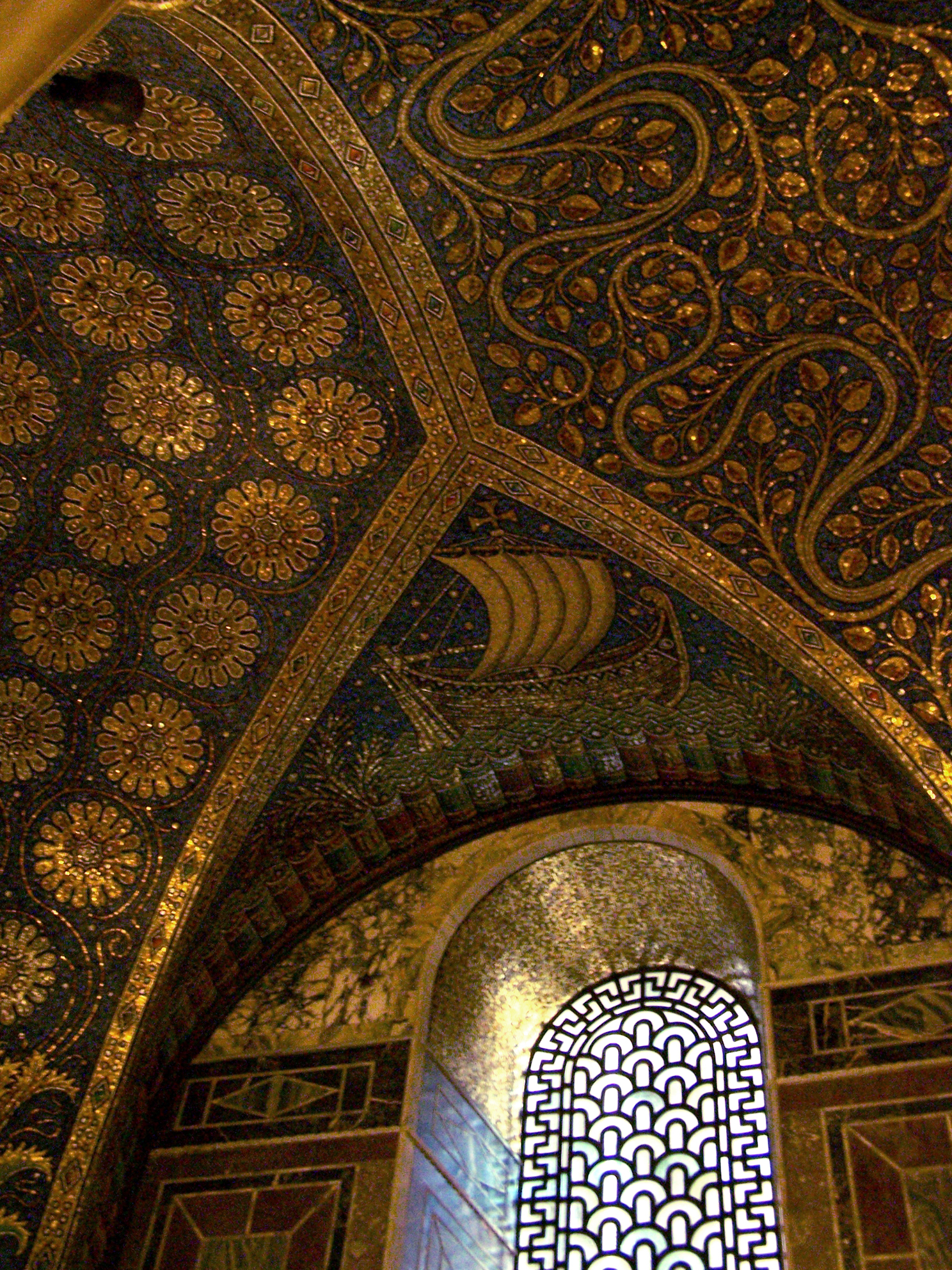
Mosaics

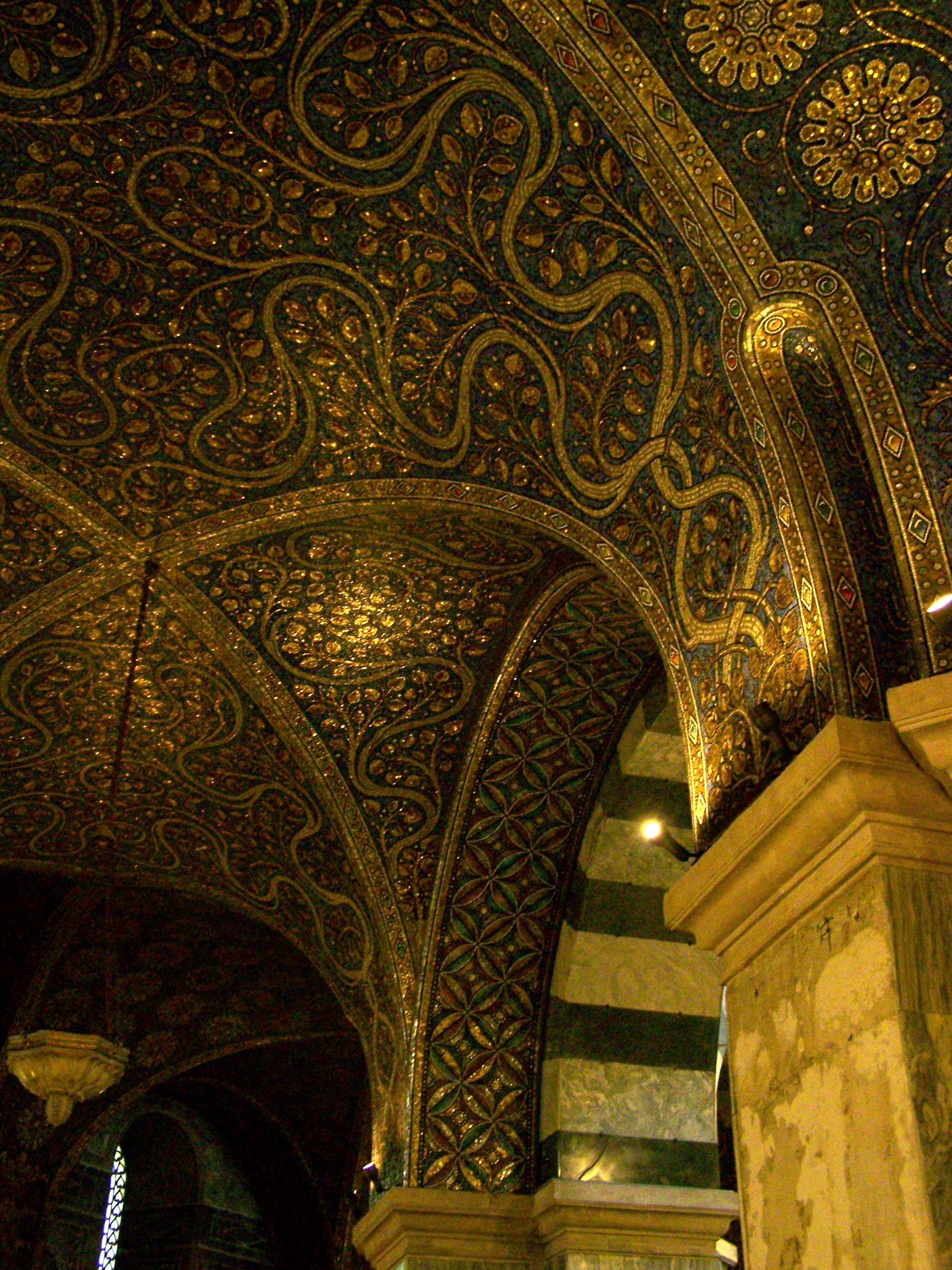
Mosaics

Cockerel mosaic

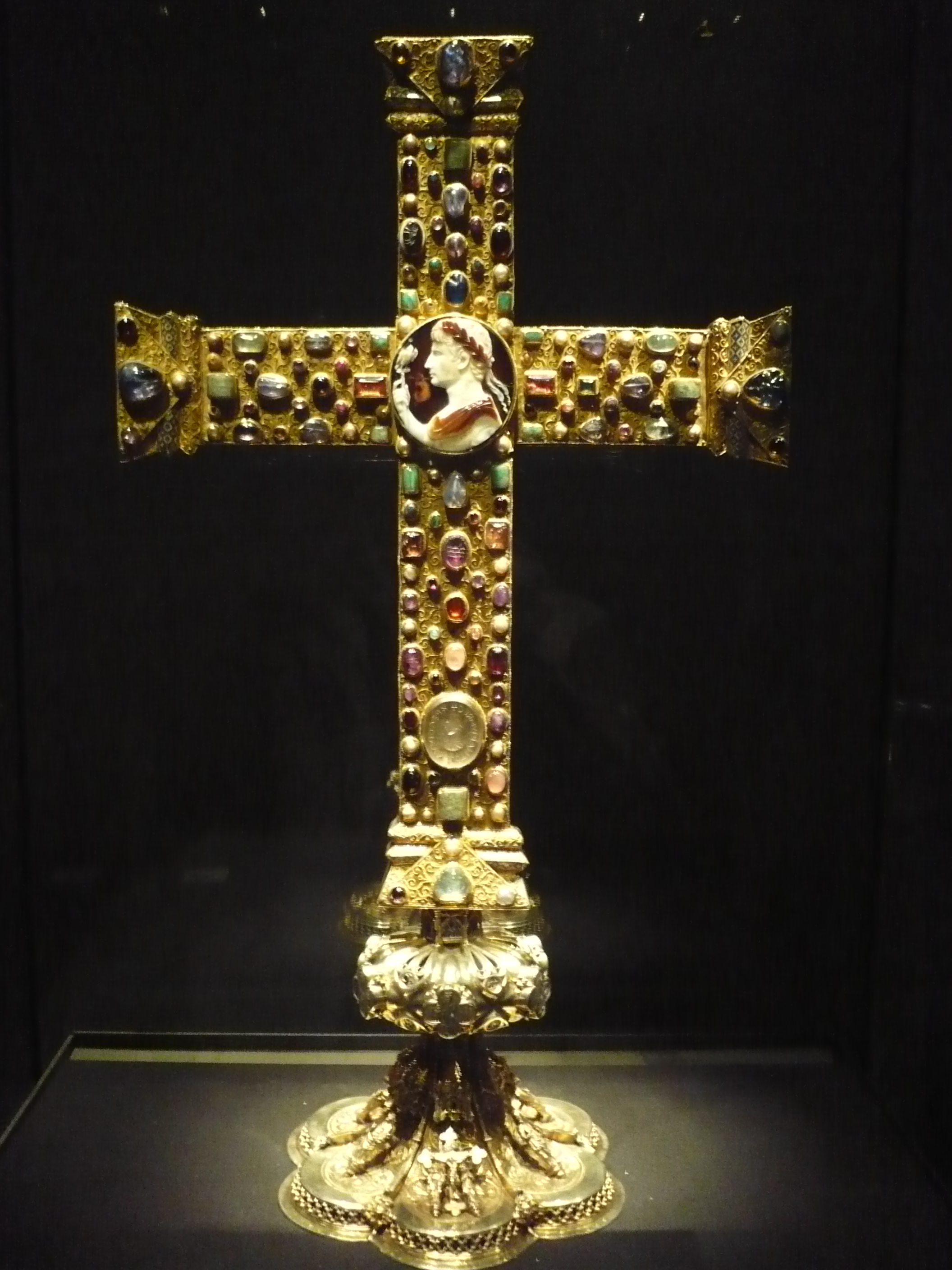
Cross of Lothair (~ 1000) (treasury)

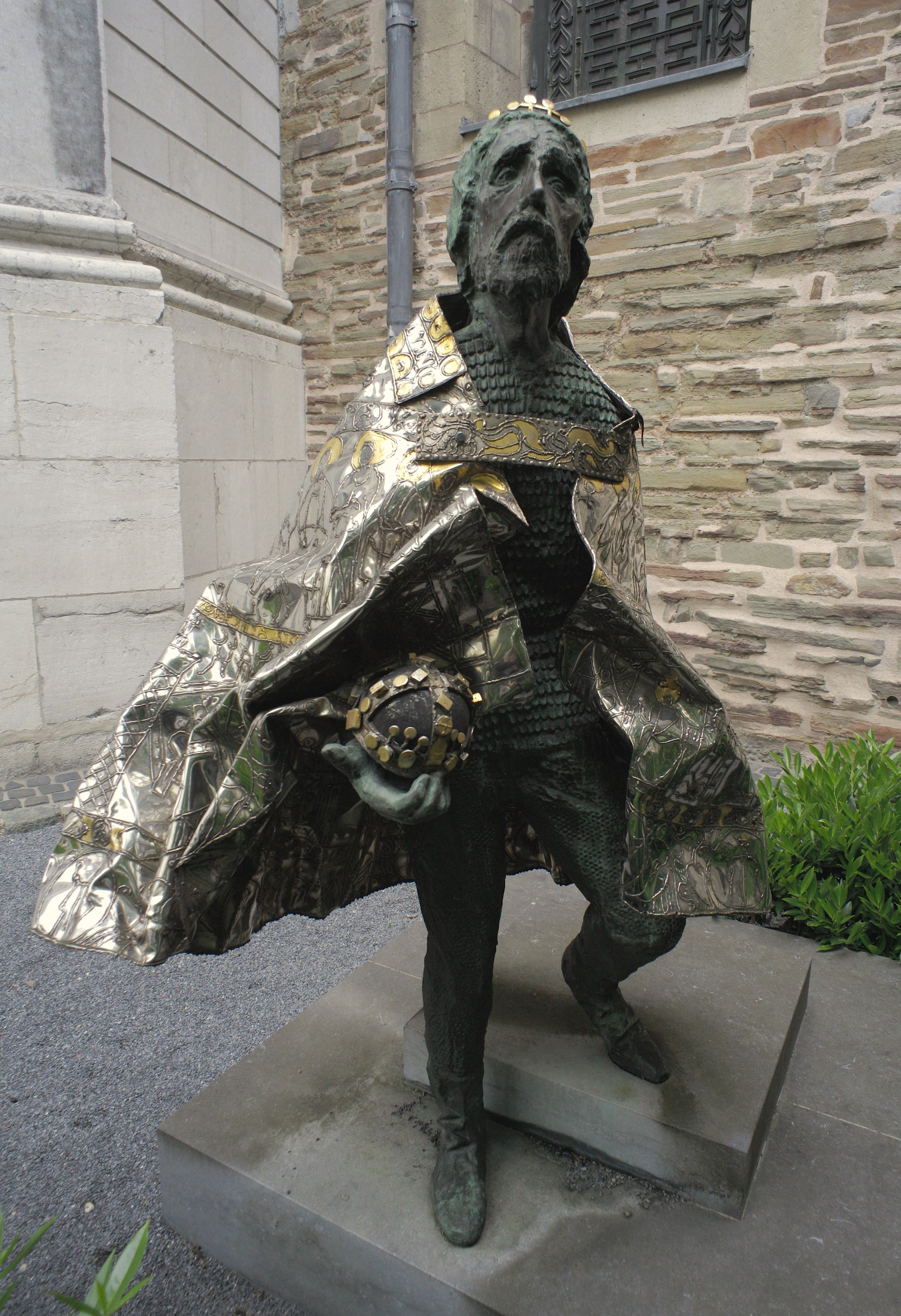
Statue of St. Stephen outside the Ungarnkapelle (Chapel of Hungary)
