= Master of the Aachen Altar =

German painter

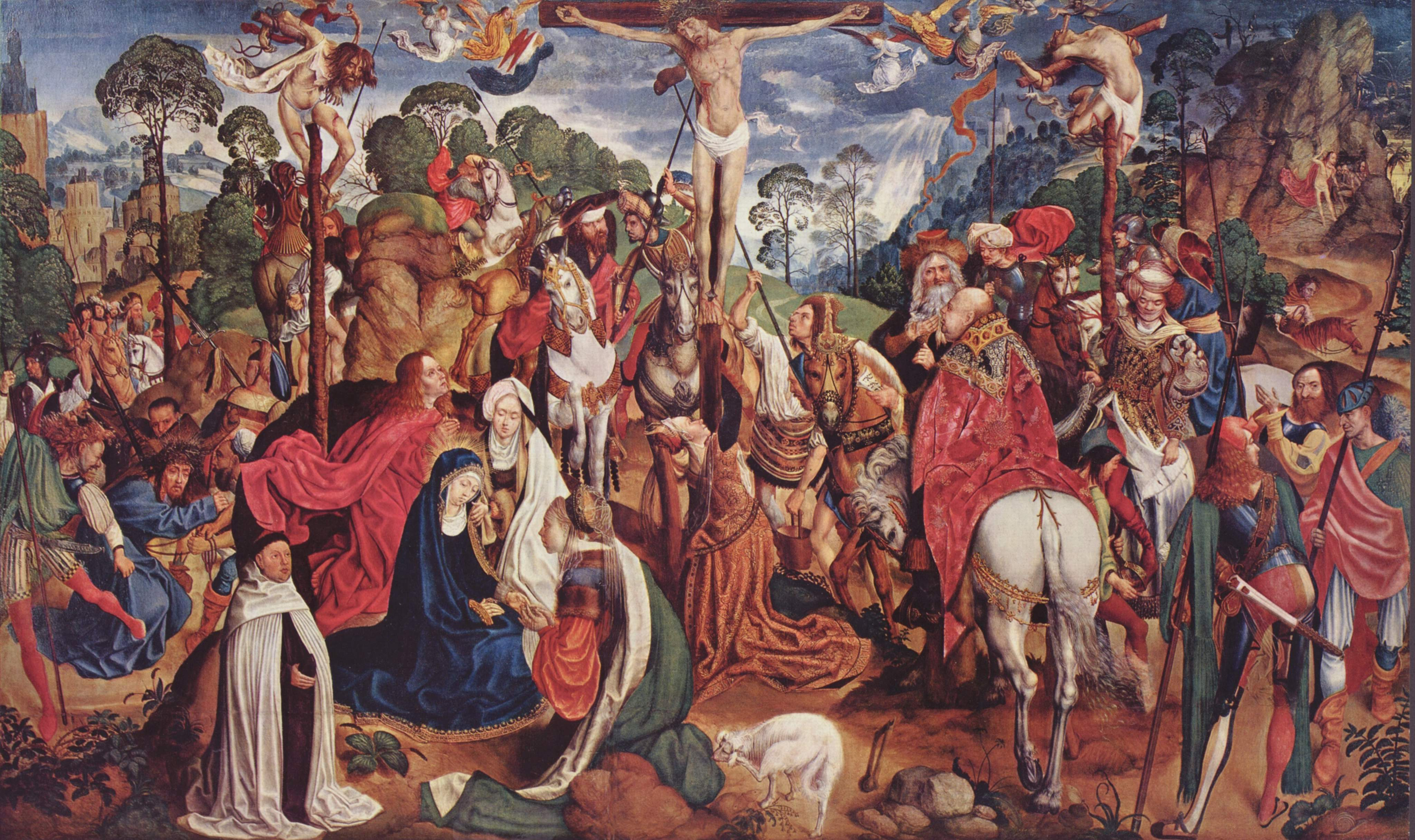
Aachen Altar: Centrepiece with the crucifixion of Christ

The notname Master of the Aachen Altar is given to an anonymous late gothic painter active in Cologne between 1495 and 1520 or 1480 and 1520, named for his master work, the Aachen Altar triptych owned by the Aachen Cathedral Treasury. Along with the Master of St Severin and the Master of the legend of St. Ursula he is part of a group of painters who were active in Cologne at the beginning of the sixteenth century and were Cologne's last significant practitioners of late gothic painting.

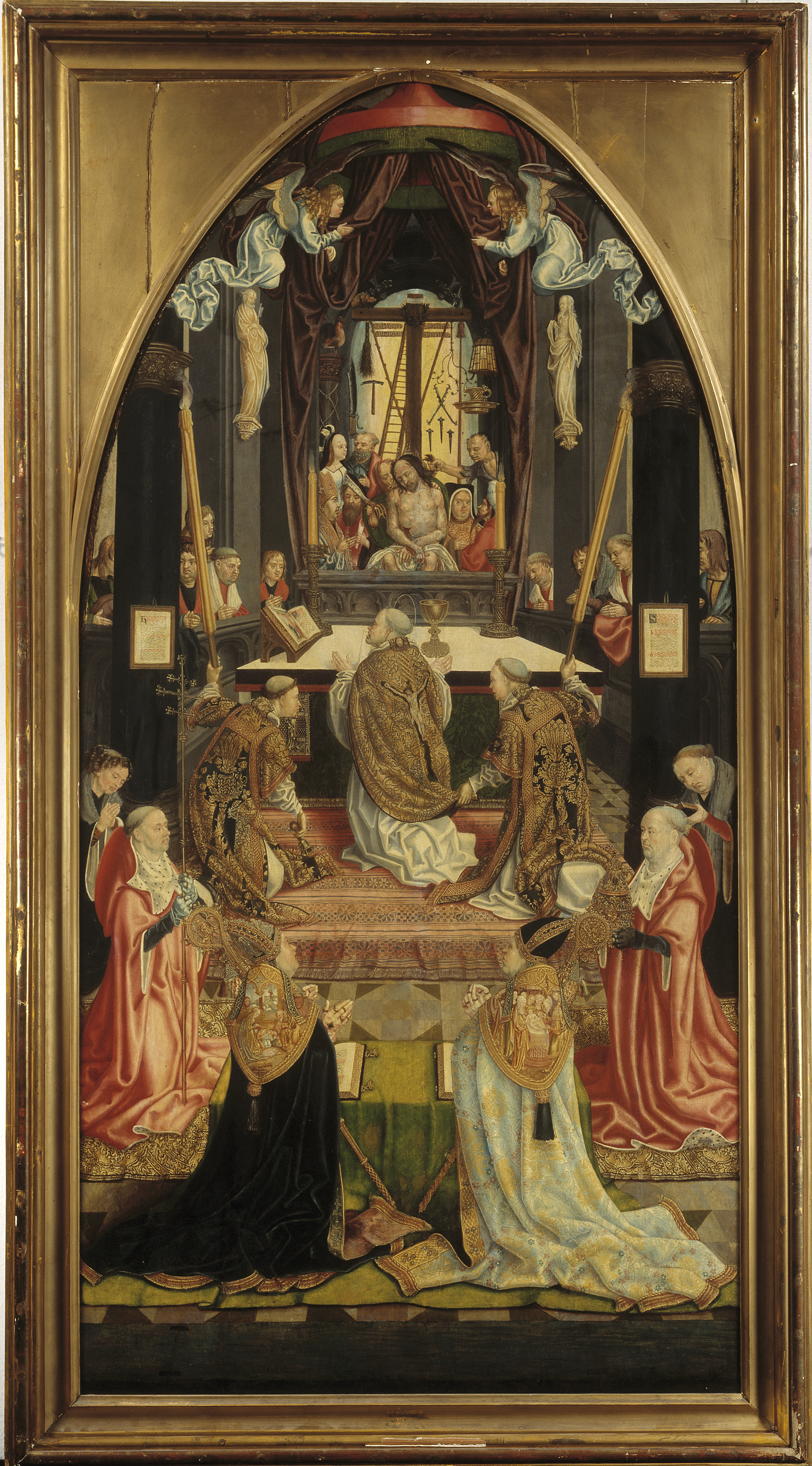
Mass of Saint Gregory

== Style ==
Like all the painters of Cologne in the second half of the fifteenth century, the Master of the Aachen Altar cannot be identified with any of the artists named in archives of the period. Since sure dates and sources are almost entirely lacking, works must be attributed by means of stylistic comparisons.

What distinguishes his work from his contemporaries is the vigorous temperament which he invested in his images. This manifests in the restless movement of his figures, densely packed scenes, turbulent compositions, rich oppositions, atmospheric landscapes, contemporary architectural themes, and the brightness of his colours. Surprising, often drastic external influences characterise his work, such as the naturalistic depictions of the symptoms of a syphilitic man and a child with Down syndrome on the Aachen Altar.

In his depiction of individuals, the Master of the Aachen Altar demonstrates an ability to create individualised portraits, as in the lifelike depiction of the establisher of a Stift on the reredos in Liverpool, as well as the depiction of Johann von Melem the Younger, the son of the Cologne-born Patrician of Frankfurt Johann von Melem. This image is now on display in the Alte Pinakothek in Munich and is usually ascribed to the Master of the Aachen Altar. That Johann von Melem the Younger, as well as his father-in-law, the Mayor of Cologne and wholesale merchant Hermann Rinck were among the painter's clients in addition to creating the Aachen Altar for a Carmelite religious order and a wall painting for the Cologne family of Hardenrath, shows the high esteem which the Master of the Aachen Altar enjoyed.

== Influences and impacts ==
The roots of the Master of the Aachen Altar in Cologne painting is beyond question. His proximity to the Master of the Holy Clan, which is clear both in stylistic matters and in the adoption of subjects and motifs, leads to the assumption that the Master of the Aachen Altar was educated in the workshop of the Master of the Holy Clan. The Master of St Severin also had an important influence on the Master of the Aachen Altar, as similarities in their figures and painting methods indicate. A partnership as journeymen in this workshop is possible. The mature works of the Master of the Aachen Altar, such as the Mary panels, show clear influence from the Master of the Saint Bartholomew Altarpiece. Further afield, the painter has taken important hints from the Netherlandish painters, such as the art of Hugo van der Goes.

The impact that the Master had on later painters does not seem to have been great. However, some works of Barthel Bruyn the Elder reveal a detailed awareness of the work of the Master of the Aachen Altar and suggest the Bruyn had frequently interacted with the compositions of the earlier Master.

== Works ==
The time between the earliest work, the Adoration of the Kings in Bonn (1493-1495) or the Portrait of Johann von Melem (1492-1497) and his last work, the Aachen altar (1515/1520), gives a floruit of a good twenty years. A longer period of activity cannot be attributed to the Master. Only a relatively small number of works can be identified fairly surely as the handiwork of the Master: two retables, a wall painting that has been destroyed, two drawings and seven single panels, some in larger formats:

Retables

- Passion Triptych, 1505-1510. Central panel: National Gallery, London. Left panel, interior Pilate Washing his Hands, exterior Mass of St Gregory, Walker Art Gallery, Liverpool. Right panel, interior Lamentation of Christ, exterior Kneeling Donors, Walker Art Gallery, Liverpool. Probably a donation to St. Kolumba, Cologne by the kneeling donors depicted on the right panel, whose coats of arms identify them as Hermann Rinck and his wife Gertrud von Dallem.
- Aachen Altar, 1515-1520, Aachen Cathedral Treasury, Aachen. Probably identical with the altarpiece attested in the Carmelite Cloister of Cologne. The donor in a Carmelite habit in the altarpiece cannot be identified with a known historical personage - there is no evidence at all for the idea that it is Theodericus de Gouda, which is uncritically repeated in older literature.

Drawings

- Adoration of the Kings, 1505-1510, Cabinet des Dessins du Musée du Louvre, Paris. This pen and ink sketch is a study for the Adoration of the Kings panel displayed in Berlin.
- Resurrection of Lazarus, 1510-1515, Kupferstichkabinett, Berlin. Pen and ink.

Single panels

- Portrait of Johann von Melem, 1492-1497, Alte Pinakothek, Munich. The subject, Frankfurt wholesaler Johann von Melem the Younger, was born in 1455-60 and the inscription gives his ages as 37 years, providing a rough date for the work.
- Adoration of the Kings, 1493-1495, Rheinisches Landesmuseum, Bonn (loan).
- Adoration of the Kings, 1505-1510, Gemäldegalerie, Berlin. The panel is identified by the house mark at lower left as a donation of Johann Petit of Cologne, probably for the Cologne Charterhouse.
- Christ as Saviour of the World, 1505-1510, Wallraf-Richartz Museum, Cologne.
- Mary with Child between St Catherine and St Ursula, 1510, Private collection.
- Mass of St Gregory, 1510-1515, Museum Catharijneconvent, Utrecht.
- Mary with Child and Angels playing Music, 1515, Alte Pinakothek, Munich.

== Bibliography ==
- Marita to Berens-Jurk. Der Meister des Aachener Altars. Mainz 2002 (Mainz, Universität, Dissertation, 2000).
- Ulrike Nürnberger. Zeitenwende. Zwei Kölner Maler um 1500. Jüngerer Meister der Heiligen Sippe, Meister des Aachener Altars (= Bilder im Blickpunkt). Gemäldegalerie – Staatliche Museen zu Berlin Preußischer Kulturbesitz, Berlin 2000, ISBN 3-88609-310-7 (Ausstellungskatalog, Staatliche Museen zu Berlin, Gemäldegalerie, 17. März – 18. Juni 2000).
- Frank Günter Zehnder. Katalog der Altkölner Malerei (= Kataloge des Wallraf-Richartz-Museums. Bd. 11, ISSN 0588-3431). Wienand, Köln 1990.
