= Aachen Altar =

Triptych by the Master of the Achen Altar

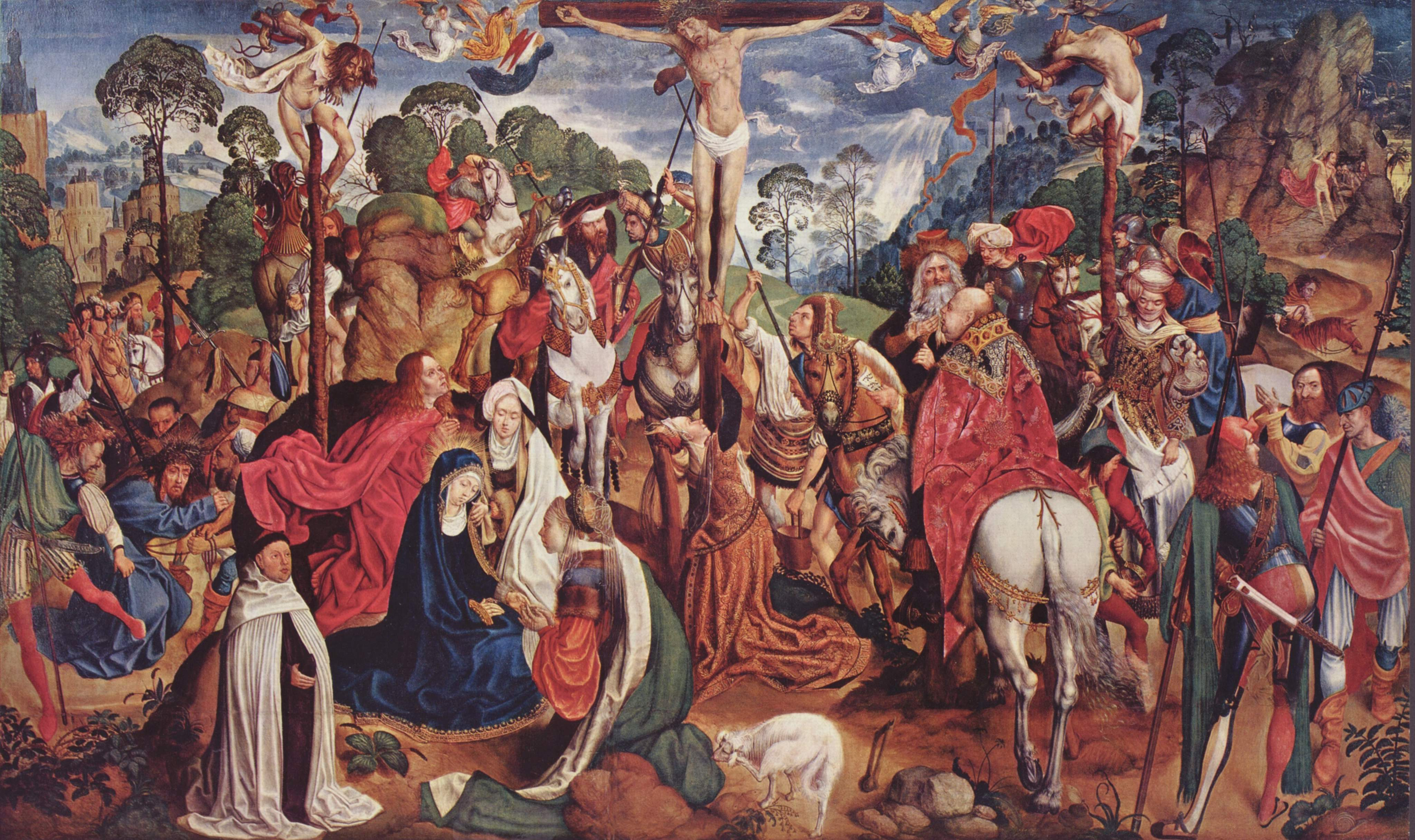
Centrepiece of the Aachen Altar with the crucifixion of Christ, Aachen Cathedral Treasury

The Aachen Altar (de: Aachener Altar) or Passion Altar (Passionsaltar) is a late gothic passion triptych in the Aachen Cathedral Treasury, made by the so-called Master of the Aachen Altar around 1515/20 in Cologne.

== Construction and description ==
The open, three winged polyptych altar image shows scenes from the Passion of Christ to his Ascension in continuous sequence from left to right. At the assumed time of composition, this type of depiction was already well-established. On the left wing of the altar, Jesus is crowned with the Crown of thorns and confronts Pontius Pilate. The central panel depicts the Stations of the Cross, with the Crucifixion of Jesus as the central scene. This panel also shows the Harrowing of Hell and the suicide of Judas. On the right wing is the Lamentation of Christ, his burial, the meeting with Mary Magdalen, and the Ascension.

The painter stresses the passion scenes as a bloody ordeal through the use of red paint throughout the whole image. With the exception of Jesus, Mary and John, everyone is depicted in contemporary clothing in a local landscape. The biblical scenes are presented to the viewer, providing the opportunity for introspection. Furthermore, in the division of the centrepiece into a "good side" on the left of the crucifixion and a "bad side" on the right and in the direction of glances and gestures towards the viewer, the panel demands that the viewer make a personal choice between salvation and damnation.

On the left wing, the soldier bringing Jesus to Pilate has a scimitar and suit of armour of Turkish style, reflecting the great fear of a Turkish attack on Christian Europe at the time of the work's composition. In addition, a child with signs of down syndrome being deloused by a monkey in the possession of Satan, alludes to the role of Satan (who appears in person on the upper right of the central panel) in Christ's death. The thin youth with a dark beret is often considered a self-portrait of the painter. In the background of the left panel a church with unfinished towers is visible, which was long thought to be Cologne Cathedral (probably incorrectly). The Schildergasse and the Dreikönigenpförtchen have been similarly identified in the alley in front of the cathedral, while the church facade poking out from behind a column has been identified as the Carmelite cloister of Cologne.

On the outsides of the wings there are six saints under an arcade in front of a brocade pattern, who are face the viewer when the triptych is closed. The outer two saints are Carmelites and are especially emphasised by church steeples. The saints on the left wing are the Carmelite Saint Anthony of Hungary, Saint Barbara, Saint Sebastian; the saints on the left wing are Saint Lawrence, Saint Catherine and the Carmelite Saint Angel.

== History ==
The exact date of the triptych's donation is not known. The supposed donor, Theodericus de Gouda was the Provincial superior of the Carmelite Cloister of Cologne and died in 1539. The triptych was on the Volksaltar of the Cologne Carmelite Church until 1642. It came into the Cologne collection of the Jacob Lyversberg before 1834 after which it went to the Cologne collection of Haan, from whom Aachen Cathedral acquired it in 1872. At that point it was installed in the Choir.

== Painter ==
The unknown master responsible for the work, tentatively identified with the engraver P.W., seems to have been active in Cologne between 1480 and 1580. This explains the close relationship of his work to the works of his contemporaries in Cologne, the Master of St Severin and the earlier Master of the legend of St. Ursula, as a demonstration of the popularity of altar images in Cologne around 1495/1500. Aspects of technique support its origin in the Middle Rhine, but Early Netherlandish influence is visible, as well as that of Antwerp Mannerism. The depiction of the sick child, the blind Roman legionnaires and the syphilitic judges betrays a degree of detail which seems almost medical.

== Bibliography ==
- Herta Lepie, Georg Minkenberg. Die Schatzkammer des Aachener Domes. Brimberg, Aachen 1995, ISBN 3-923773-16-1, pp. 46f.
- Marita to Berens-Jurk. Der Meister des Aachener Altars. Mainz 2002.
