= Hoop crown =

Arched crown

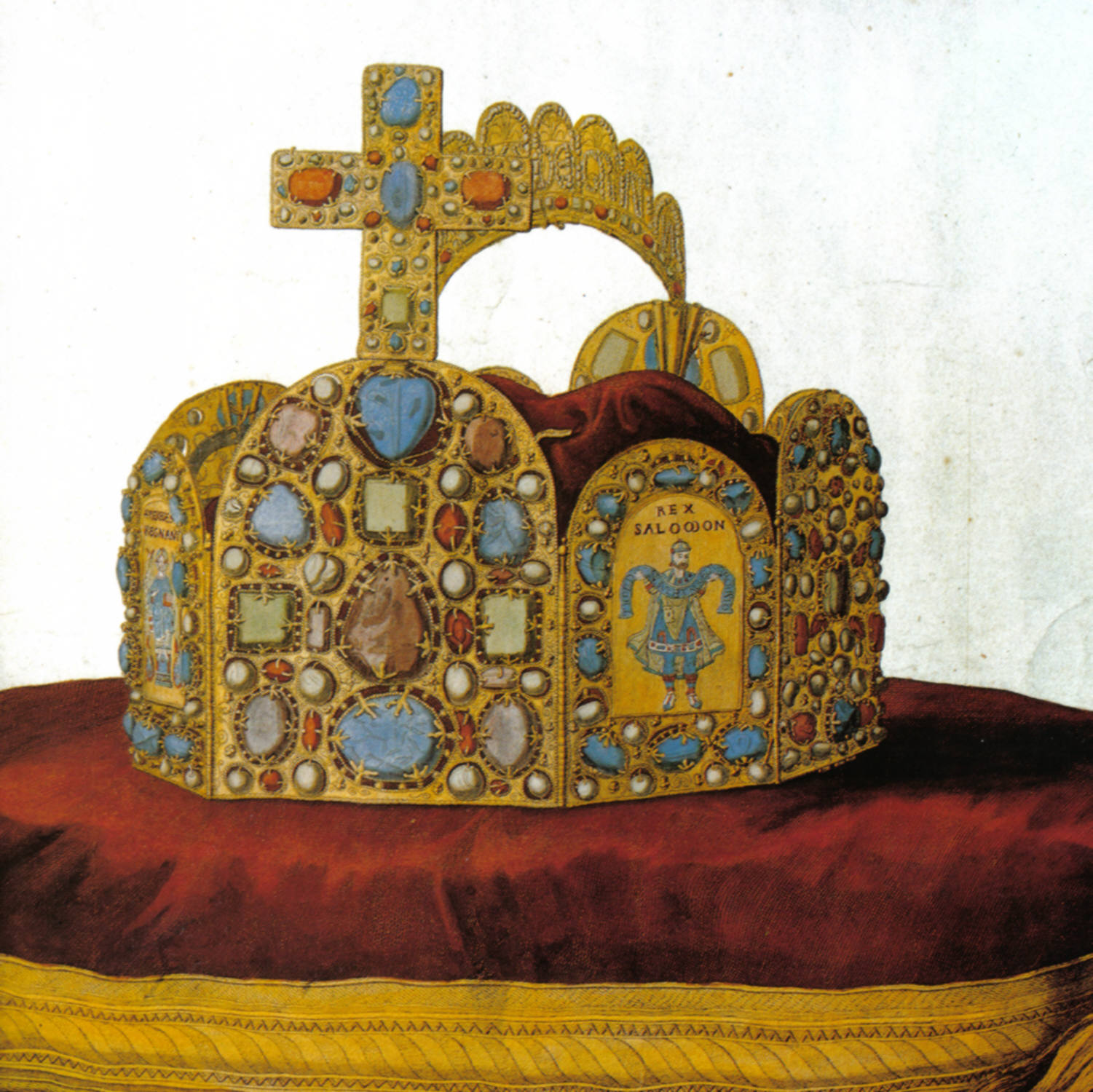
Hoop crown of the Holy Roman Empire

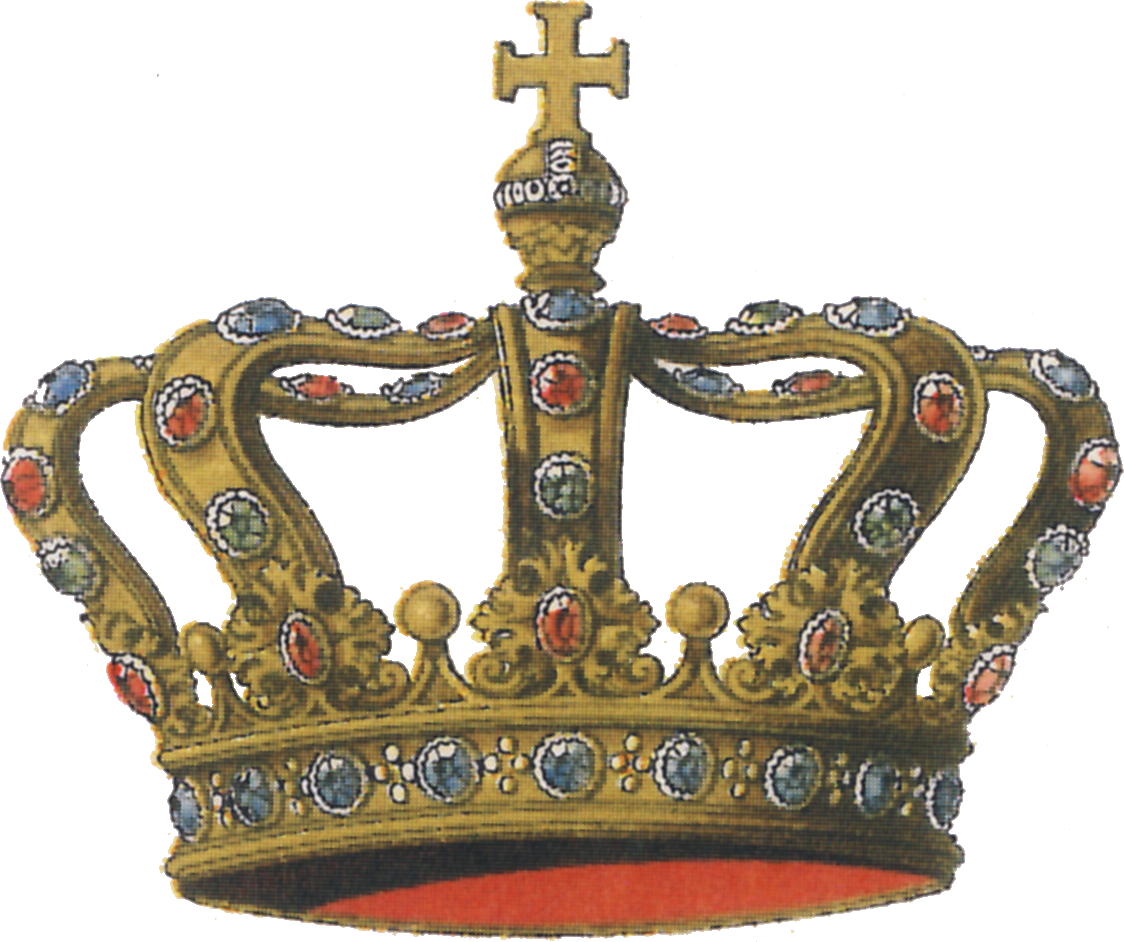
Bavarian hoop crown, which used to carry the Wittelsbach Diamond

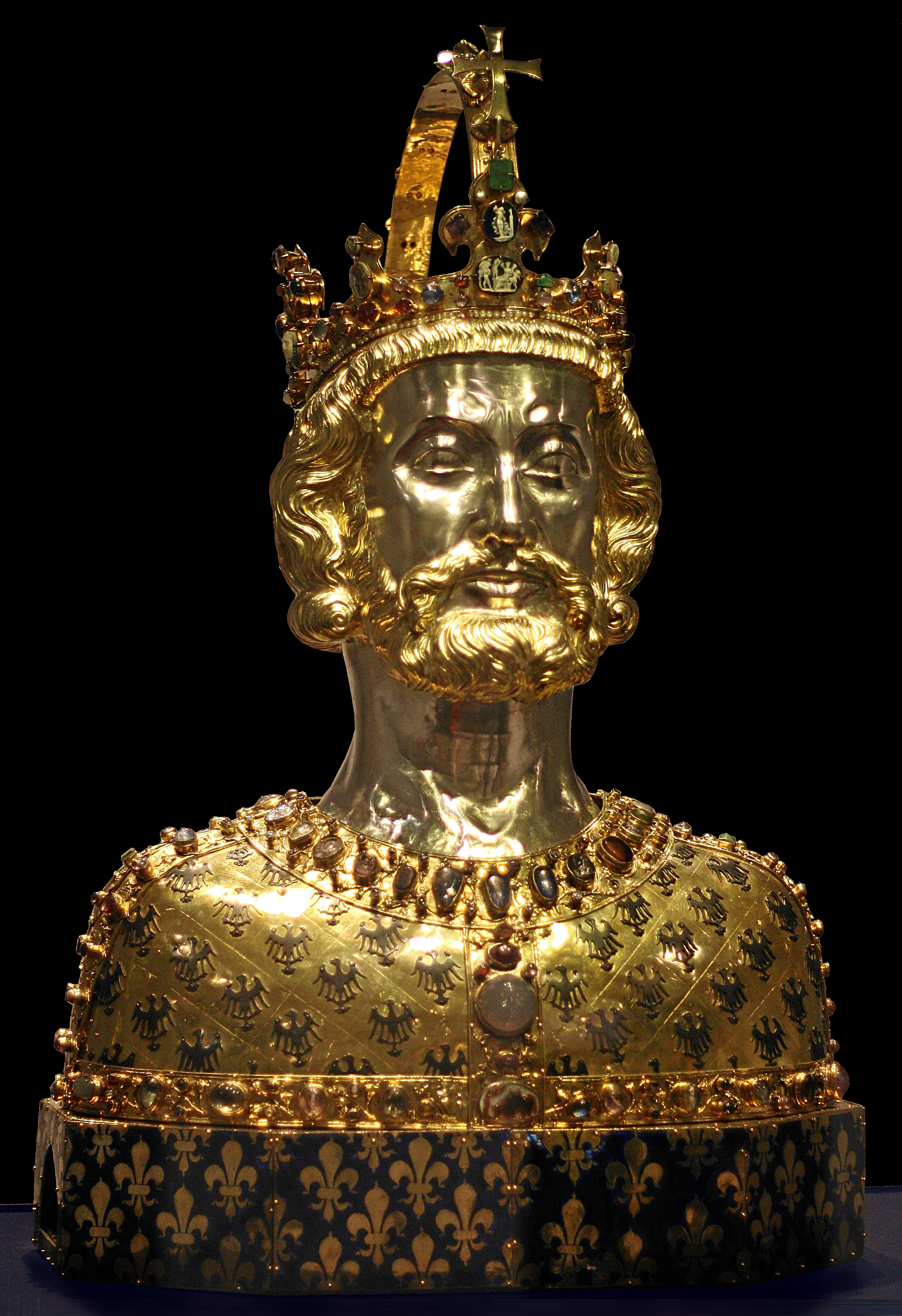
Hoop crown on the late Gothic Bust of Charlemagne, Aachen Cathedral Treasury

A hoop crown (German: Bügelkrone or Spangenkrone, Latin: faislum), arched crown, or closed crown, is a crown consisting of a "band around the temples and one or two bands over the head". First used by the Carolingian dynasty, hoop crowns became increasingly popular among royal dynasties in the Late Middle Ages, and the dominant type of crown in the Modern Era.

== Origins ==
Hoop crowns were introduced to Germanic Europe by the Carolingian dynasty, who usurped the throne of the Frankish Empire from the Merovingian dynasty in 751. However their use dates back to the end of the Roman Empire and the Byzantine Empire. The Carolingian hoop crown was most probably derived from the contemporary Germanic hoop helmet (German: Spangenhelm). The oldest such crown is the Crown of Saint Faith in Conques, worn either by Pepin I (797–838) or Pepin II (823–864) of Aquitaine. Other Carolingians known to have worn hoop crowns are Louis II "the German" (806–876), Charles II "the Bald" (823–877) and Odo of Vermandois (910–946). Charlemagne (742–814) possibly wore a hoop crown, although the obscurities of contemporary portraits, in particular on seals, mean that this cannot be stated with certainty. Sometimes, the Carolingian hoop crowns were combined with a cap, worn beneath.

Though hoop crowns were characteristic for Carolingian kings, there were several other types of crowns worn by the members of this dynasty. For example, Charlemagne also wore a crown shaped like a collar with an attachment on the front side. The features most Carolingian crowns had in common were "cap or bands over the head, edge-bands, and pendilia". Some of the Carolingian crowns were imitations of contemporary Byzantine Imperial crowns, which had the shape of a closed cap (kamelaukion). In turn, Byzantine Emperor Justinian I "the Great" (483–565) had hoops attached to his crown to carry a cross above it, creating the prototype of later hoop crowns.

== Spread ==
Hoop crowns became popular in late medieval Europe. The Holy Roman Imperial crown was a hoop crown. Norman king William the Conqueror wore a hoop crown, and in the 12th century, the kings of Hungary amended their collar with two hoops. In both cases, the object of adopting a hoop crown was not to appear to occupy a position of inferiority to the Holy Roman Emperor. William's crown was modelled after the crown of emperor Otto I and similarly decorated with twelve types of gems. In addition, William had sceptre and virga created, resembling the imperial insignia.

However, not all late medieval crowns had hoops. For example, the 15th-century kings of France wore crowns of the lilly type, a collar decorated with four lilies. The hoop crown became the prevalent type of crown in the Early Modern Age.

== See also ==
- Circlet
- Half-arch (crown)

== Sources ==
=== Bibliography ===
- Beck, Heinrich; Jankuhn, Herbert; Ranke, Kurt; Wenskus, Reinhard, eds. (1984). "Diadem". RGA (Reallexikon der Germanischen Altertumskunde) (in German). Vol. 5 (2 ed.).
- Hartmann, Peter W., ed. (1996). "Spangenkrone, Bügelkrone". Kunstlexikon (in German). Beyars. ISBN 3-9500612-0-7. Archived from the original on 2017-12-01.
- Kornbluth, Genevra (1990). "The Seal of Lothar II. Model and Copy". Francia. Forschungen zur europäischen Geschichte. 1 (17). Archived from the original on 2012-08-11.
- Lohrmann, D. (1973). "Rezensionen. P. E. Schramm, Kaiser, Könige und Päpste. Gesammelte Aufsätze zur Geschichte des Mittelalters, Band 2, Stuttgart 1968". Francia. Forschungen zur europäischen Geschichte (in German) (1).
- Schramm, Percy Ernst (1956). Herrschaftszeichen und Staatssymbolik. Beiträge zu ihrer Geschichte vom dritten bis zum sechzehnten Jahrhundert. Schriften der Monumenta Germaniae Historica, Volume 13 (in German). Vol. 3. Hierseman.
- Schramm, Percy Ernst (1959). "Die Bügelkrone, ein karolingisches Herrschaftszeichen. Mit einem Anhang: die Lobwörter decus imperii und spes imperii". In Wegener, Wilhelm (ed.). Festschrift für Karl Gottfried Hugelmann zum 80. Geburtstag am 26. September 1959 (in German). Vol. 2. Scienta Verlag. pp. 561–579.
- Schulz, Matthias (2010-01-25). "Schleifstein der Schande" (in German). Der Spiegel Online.
