= Noli me tangere casket =

1356 silver-gilt casket

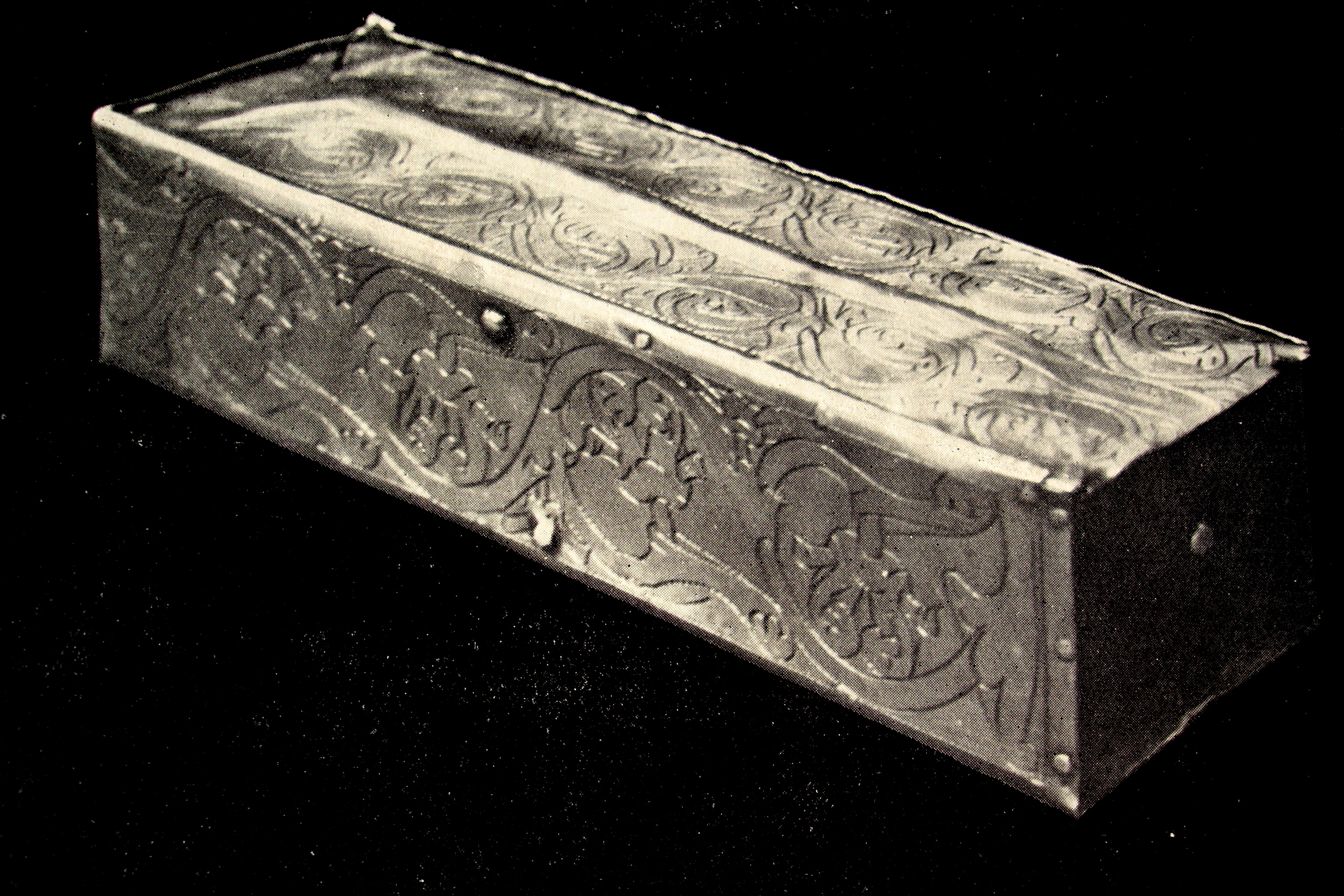
The Noli me tangere casket

The Noli me tangere casket (Noli me tangere: Latin for "Don't touch me") was a small silver-gilt casket made in 1356 for the Aachen Cathedral Treasury. It measured 15.2 cm (6.0 in) in length, 3.7 cm (1.5 in) in height and 4.8 cm (1.9 in) in width. The casket was kept in the Marienschrein together with the key relics of the cathedral until the nineteenth century and the casket remained in the possession of the cathedral treasury until its destruction during the Second World War.

== Origin of the Noli me tangere casket ==
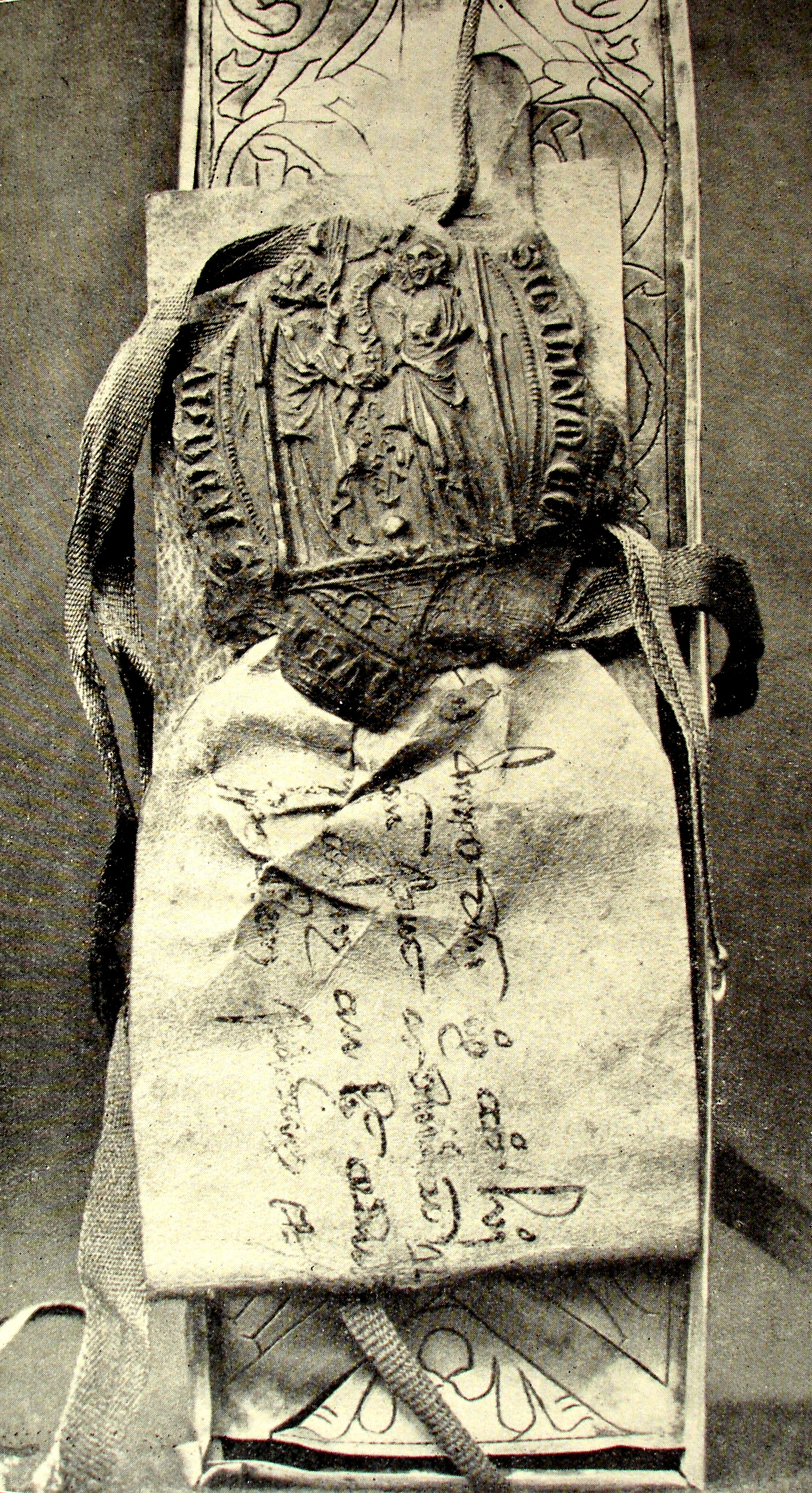
Document attached to the casket

Four so-called "great relics" belong to Aachen cathedral: The dress of Mary, the diaper of Jesus, the decapitation cloth of John the Baptist and the loincloth of Christ, along with other lesser relics. Since 1349, these cloths have been displayed and venerated as contact relics in Aachen every seven years during the Aachen pilgrimage. One legend says that it was during such a pilgrimage that a pilgrim was able to remove and steal a small part of each of the sacred cloths, despite the strict guard. At the death of this pilgrim a year later, he is said to have repented of his deed and returned the stolen fabric to the Aachen cathedral chapter. The canon of cathedral chapter is said to have been so embarrassed by this evidence of his negligence that, in 1356, he ordered the production of a small silver box to store the returned bits of relic in. After the casket was locked, he wrapped it in a green silk ribbon, sealed it and attached a parchment, on which was written in Medieval Latin:

Anno domini M CCC LVI in festo magne dedicacionis ecclesie beate marie virginis Aquensis fuit ordinatum per capitulum dicte ecclesie ad hoc indictum quod presens sarculum cui hec scedula est appensa de cetero non apperiatur et hoc propter specialem statum et utilitatem ecclesie antedicte. In the year of the Lord 1356, at the feast of the great dedication of the church of the blessed virgin Mary in Aachen, it was ordered by the chapter of said church that the present casket, to which this document is appended, not be opened hereafter and this on account of the special status and expediency of the aforesaid church.

On account of this inscription the silver casket became known colloquially by the name Noli me tangere. The expression derives from the Gospel of John, in which the resurrected Jesus prevents Mary Magdalene from touching him with these words (John 20:17).

== Mysterious contents ==
In the following 448 years, no one changed the condition of the casket. It was removed from the Marienschrein along with the other relics every seven years, blessed, and then returned to the shrine. At the end of the Late Middle Ages, the casket was often seen as a valuable relic itself and in accordance with its special significance as a relic its contents were not allowed to be viewed by anyone. A story was reported that a Dean of Aachen had opened the casket out of curiosity and was immediately struck blind as a result, increasing the mystery around the small casket.

== Opening of the casket ==
The actual contents of the casket are said to have been revealed by an accident. At the beginning of the nineteenth century Aachen and the Rheinland were under French occupation and in 1804 Empress Joséphine, wife of Napoleon, visited Aachen. On this occasion, it is said, the Bishop of Aachen, Marc-Antoine Berdolet, showed the Empress some of the relics of Aachen, as was usual for high-status visitors. Among other things, the casket was handed to her. The lock gave way when touched and the casket came open. Inside there were cloth fragments from the Aachen relics. The Empress was very frightened, since someone had told her the story of the blinded dean. With the opening of the casket the centuries-old mystery about the contents was finally revealed.

== Location of the casket ==
At the time of the Second World War, most of the Aachen cathedral treasures were moved multiple times, ending up in Siegen, from which they were returned to Aachen once more after the war. A few pieces of treasure remained in Aachen, however, such as the so-called pectoral of Charlemagne and the Noli me tangere casket. Msgr. Crumbach, then Master of the Treasury, secured both objects in his cellar during the bombing of the city. But on 10 July 1941, a phosphorus bomb hit his house and destroyed the casket with its contents.
