= Cross of Lothair =

Jewelled cross dating from c.1000AD

Coordinates: 50.7751°N 6.0828°E

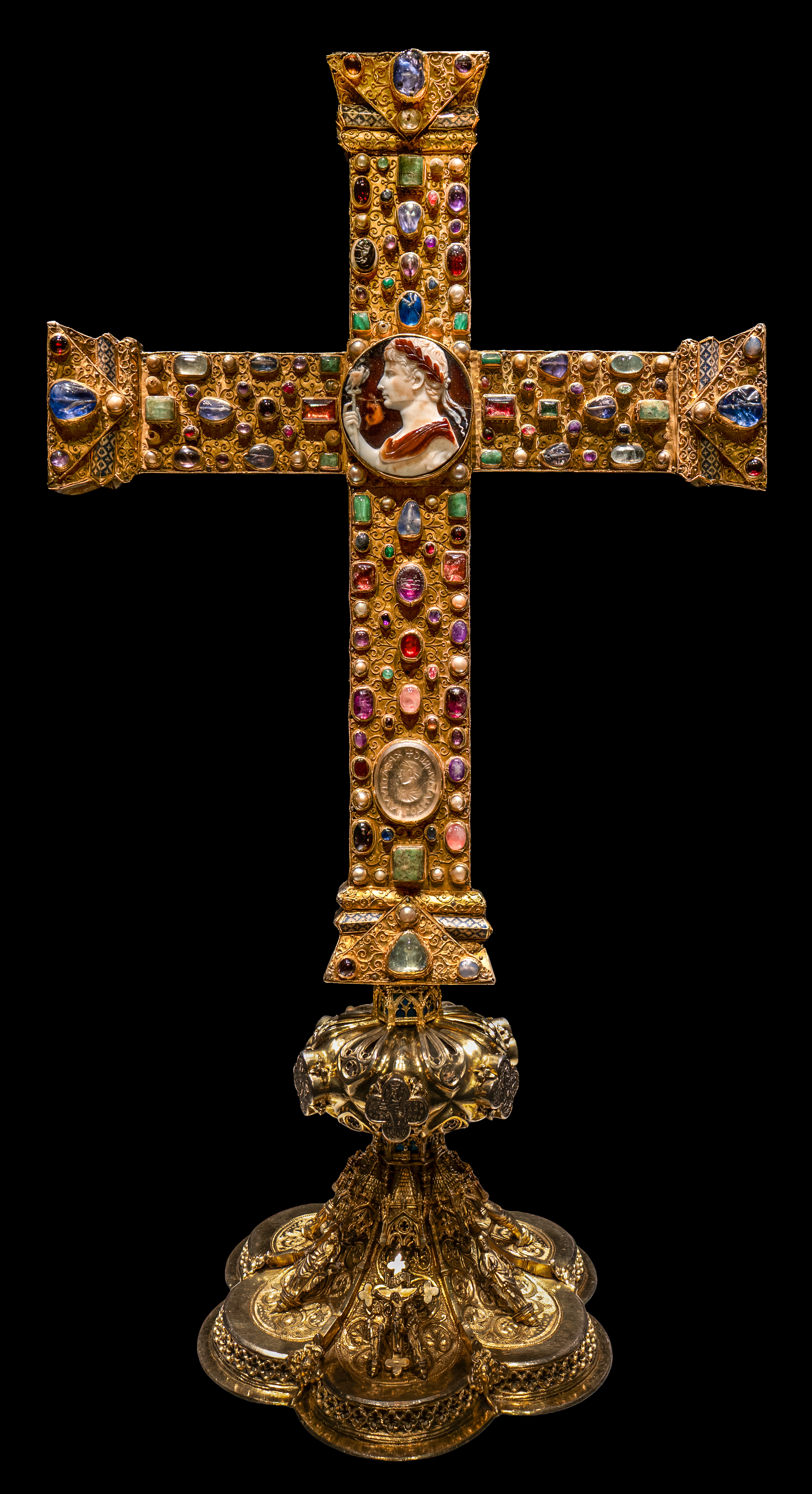
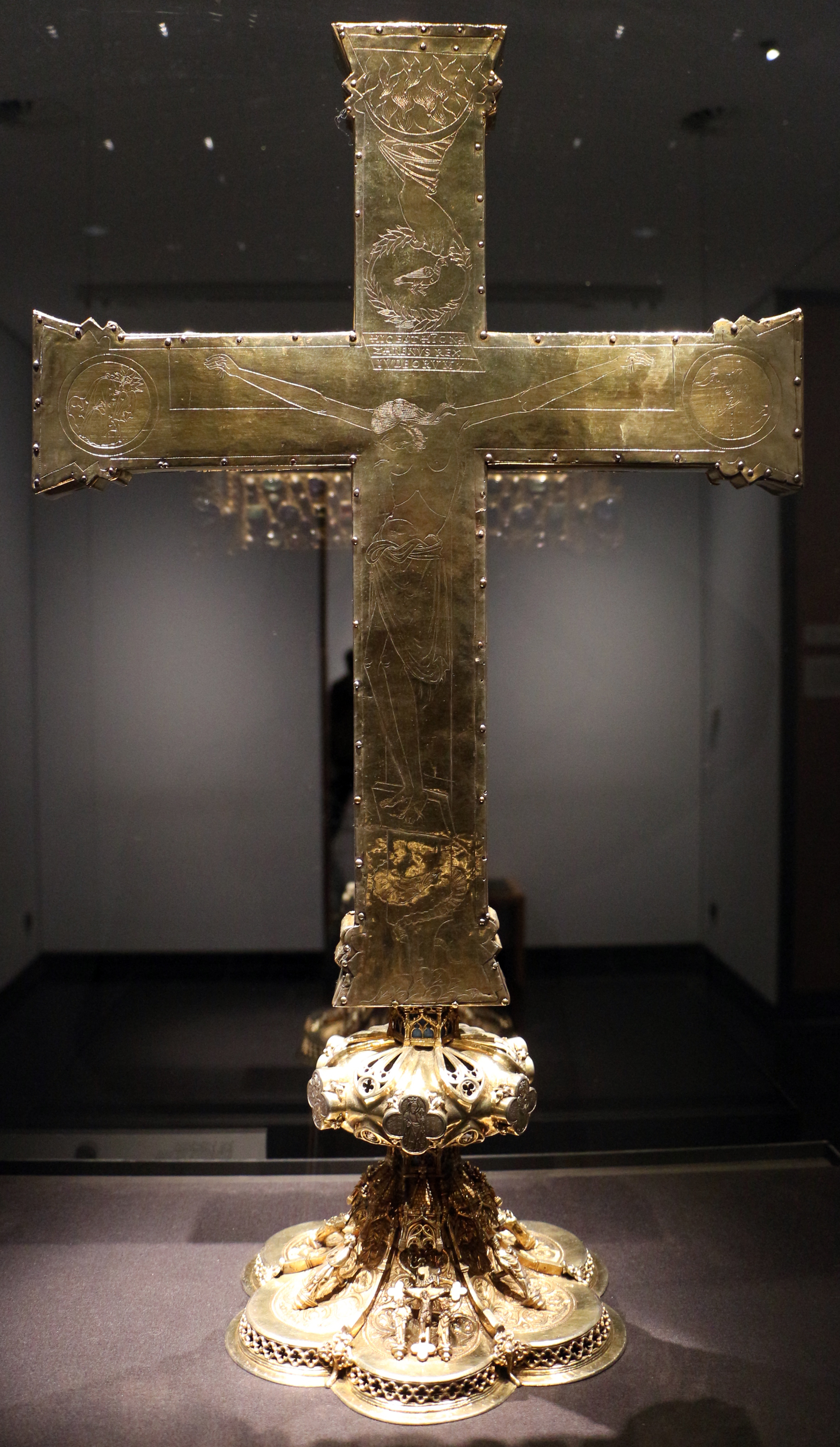
The front side (Kaiserseite, "imperial side") of the Cross of Lothair (left).
Back of the cross, with engraved crucifixion (right).

The Cross of Lothair or Lothair Cross (German: Lotharkreuz) is a crux gemmata (jewelled cross) processional cross dating from about 1000 AD, though its base dates from the 14th century. It was made in Germany, probably at Cologne. It is an outstanding example of medieval goldsmith's work, and "an important monument of imperial ideology", forming part of the Aachen Cathedral Treasury, which includes several other masterpieces of sacral Ottonian art. The measurements of the original portion are 50 cm height, 38.5 cm width, 2.3 cm depth.

The cross comes from the period when Ottonian art was evolving into Romanesque art, and the engraved crucifixion on the reverse looks forward to the later period.

== History ==
The cross takes its name from the large engraved greenish rock crystal seal near its base bearing the portrait and name of the Carolingian ruler Lothair II, King of Lotharingia (835–869), and a nephew of Charles the Bald. The cross was actually made over a century after Lothair's death for one of the Ottonian dynasty, the successors of the Carolingian dynasty; possibly for Otto III, Holy Roman Emperor. It appears to have been donated to the cathedral as soon as it was made.

The cross is still used in processions today. On high feast days it is carried into Aachen Cathedral where it is placed next to the main altar during mass. For the rest of the time, it is on display in the Cathedral Treasury Museum.

== Description and interpretation ==
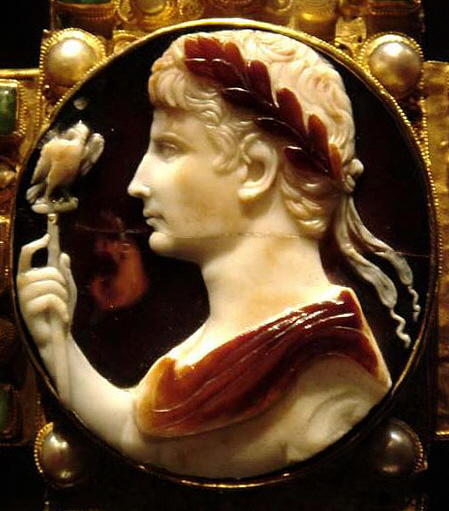
The Augustus cameo at the center of the Cross of Lothair

The oak core of the Lothair Cross is encased in gold and silver and encrusted with jewels and engraved gems – a total of 102 gems and 35 pearls. The front of the cross (in the terms used here) is made of gold and silver plate and is richly decorated with precious stones, pearls, gold filigree and cloisonné enamel. There is a case for describing this as the reverse side, as some sources do, as it may have been carried that way in processions, with the plain engraved crucifixion facing forward, and the gem-encrusted face facing the emperor who followed the cross. The enamel is on the bands of the terminals that are interrupted by the points of the triangular sections. The gems in the centre rows are mounted in raised drum-like platforms, their sides decorated with arcades in filigree. The flat surface of the arms is decorated all over with filigree tendrils. At the meeting point of the arms is a first-century AD sardonyx three-layered cameo of the Roman Emperor Augustus holding an eagle sceptre, also mounted on a raised drum.

On the assumption that the Ottonians were aware that the cameo was a portrait of Augustus (some coins of that era showed Charlemagne and his successors as Roman Emperors with short hair and laurel wreaths), it served to link the Ottonian dynasty with the original Roman emperors, and assert them as God's representatives on Earth. On the other hand, an engraved gem portrait of Augustus's daughter Julia (or Julia Flavia, daughter of the emperor Titus) at the top of the "Escrain de Charlemagne", an elaborate treasure given to the Abbey of Saint-Denis by Charles the Bald, was treated as an image of the Virgin Mary. Another gem portrait of the Roman Emperor Caracalla had a cross and the name of Saint Peter added to it before use in metalwork for the Sainte-Chapelle in Paris. It is now impossible to know the degrees of awareness of this iconographic recycling among the different categories of people creating and seeing these objects.

The second largest gem, below Augustus, was probably Lothair's seal and has his portrait with the inscription "+XPE ADIVVA HLOTARIVM REG" ("O Christ, help King Lothar"). This served a similar function, linking the Ottonians with the Carolingian dynasty who had established the position of Holy Roman Emperor. Other gems on the cross have classical carvings on them, including an amethyst with the Three Graces and a lion in onyx, both of which are mounted with the images placed sideways.

The reverse side of the Cross is a plain gold plate engraved with the Crucifixion of Jesus, with above it the Hand of God holding a victor's wreath containing the dove of the Holy Ghost; here this represents God the Father's acceptance of Christ's sacrifice. This is the earliest known appearance of the dove in this motif, which introduces the whole Trinity into a crucifixion, an iconography that was to have a long future. The Serpent, representing Satan, is twined round the bottom of the cross. In medallions at the ends of the arms are personifications of the sun and moon with heads bowed and surmounted by their symbols. The Hand with the wreath was a common motif in mosaics in Rome, and also used in art associated with the early Holy Roman Emperors, including in illuminated manuscript portraits of themselves, to emphasize their authority from God.

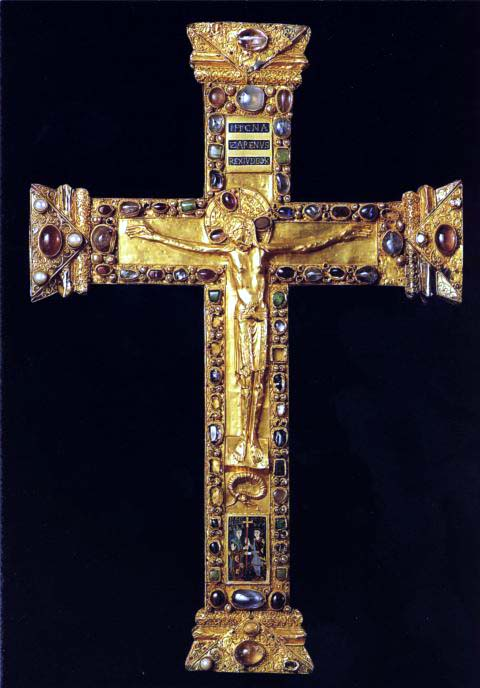
The Mathilda Cross of c. 973 has many similarities, but has a sculpted Christ on the front, above a figurative enamel plaque.

The cross is an outstanding and moving example of the Crucifixion of Jesus, closely related to the slightly earlier life-size wooden Gero Cross in Cologne, which was a crucial work in developing the Western image of the dead crucified Christ, whose head is slumped to his shoulder, and whose sagging body forms a S shape, showing the marks of his suffering, here with blood spurting from the spear-wound in his side. Engraved backs are found in many jewelled crosses of the period. The cross is now mounted on a 14th-century Gothic stand, itself decorated with two small crucifixions and other figures.

This style of gem-studded gold decoration, re-using material from antiquity, was usual for the richest objects at the time. In particular, the motif of the glorified jewelled cross, a "transformation of the crude gibbet on which Christ died", goes back to Late Antiquity, when pagan opponents of Christianity often mocked the mean nature of the primary Christian symbol. Until about the 6th century, crosses rarely showed the figure of Christ, but by 1000 other grand jewelled crosses had already moved the crucifixion, usually in gilded cast bronze, to the front face of the cross, to make them crucifixes, which would remain the most common Catholic form of cross. Some examples are the crosses of Bernward of Hildesheim (c. 1000, Hildesheim Cathedral), Gisela of Hungary (Regensburg, 1006, now Munich Residenz), and Mathilda of Essen (973, Essen Cathedral, see left), which uses a virtually identical design for the terminals of the arms to the Lothair Cross.

The Lothair Cross is in this respect a somewhat conservative object, leaving the front free for imperial symbolism, and also perhaps as a deliberate revival of Carolingian style; for example, most rich crosses of similar date made more use of enamel. The two sides can be taken to represent Church and state, fittingly for an imperial donation that was carried in front of the Holy Roman Emperors as they processed into the church. The broad form of the design matches that of the small cross at the front of the Imperial Crown of the Holy Roman Empire (c. 973/83?), which also has a jewelled front side and an engraved crucifixion on the rear.
