= Proserpina sarcophagus =

Roman marble sarcophagus in the Aachen Cathedral Treasury

Coordinates: 50°46′30.07″N 6°4′58.26″E

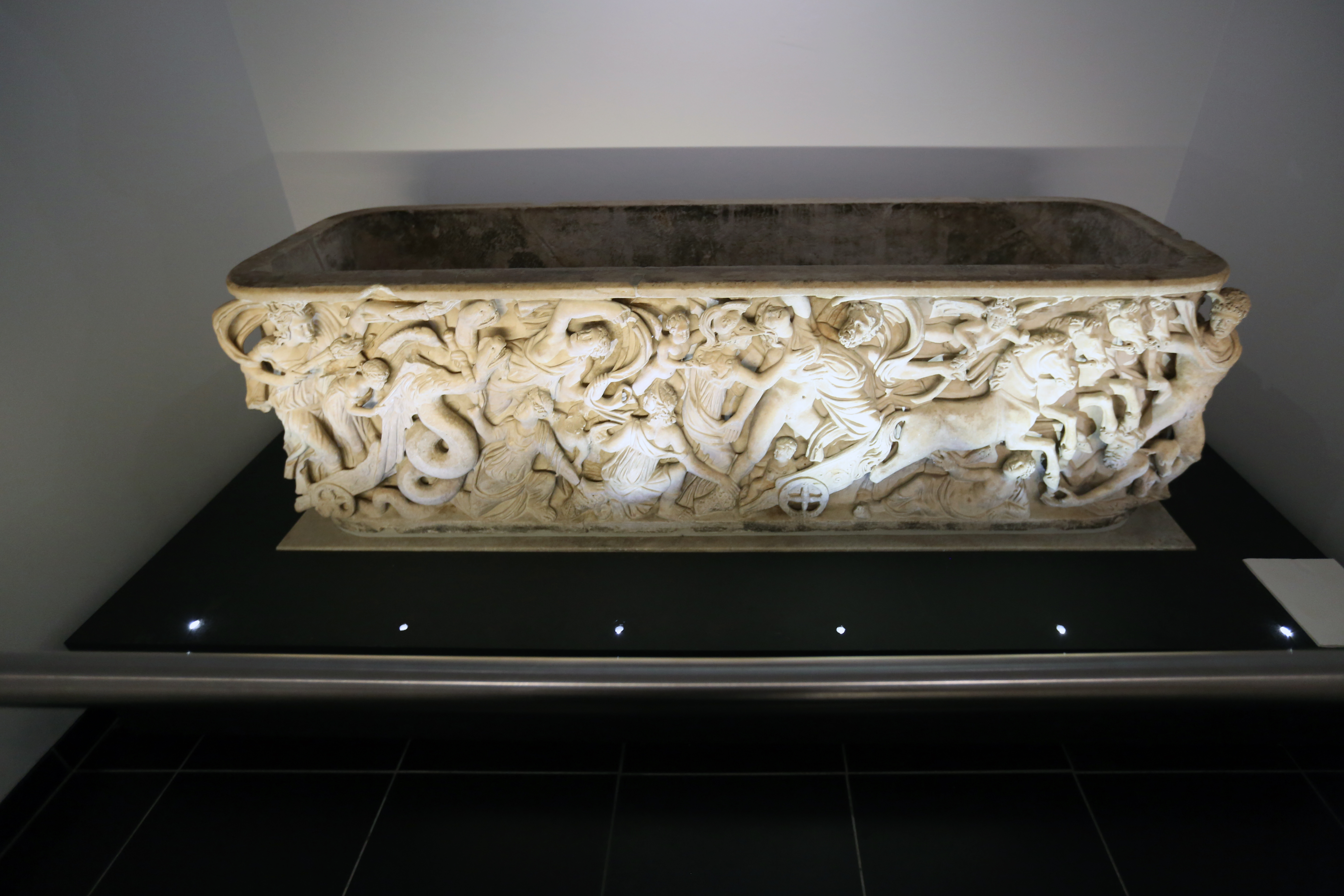
The Proserpina sarcophagus at Aachen Cathedral Treasury.

The Proserpina sarcophagus is a Roman marble sarcophagus from the first quarter of the third century AD, in which Charlemagne was probably interred on 28 January 814 in Aachen Cathedral. It is displayed today in the Aachen Cathedral Treasury.

== Description ==
The ancient myth of the Rape of Persephone is depicted in high relief on the sarcophagus. Persephone is carried away to the underworld by Hades, the god of the underworld, with the help of Athena and Eros, on a quadriga led by the divine messenger Hermes.

The hellhound Cerberus is found at Hermes' feet near the death god Tartarus. The giant Enceladus rises out of the Earth, to receive the chariot. The nymph Cyane lies at the bottom under the chariot. On a chariot steered by a winged divinity and drawn by dragons, Demeter, Persephone's mother, follows the baggage with torches in her hands. Meanwhile, Aphrodite flies, an accomplice to the kidnapping. Below her, two handmaidens of Persephone frightened have fallen to the Earth and try to protect their baskets full of flowers.

On the left narrow side in flat relief, two handmaidens of Persephone and a boy are picking flowers. The right narrow side shows a child, who is accompanied by two shepherds and carries fruit in the cornucopia of a Genius.

== Origin ==
The sarcophagus was made in the first quarter of the 3rd century AD in a workshop in the city of Rome, from carrara marble. There are many more Roman sarcophagi with depictions of the Rape of Persephone.

== Charlemagne ==
Whether Charlemagne was buried in the Persephone Sarcophagus in 814 is disputed among historians. The sources on the death and burial of Charlemagne do not expressly mention it. Nevertheless, it has been assumed that this sarcophagus could have been found among "the columns and the marble" that Charlemagne had brought from Rome and Ravenna for the building for his Palatine chapel, according to Einhard's Vita Karoli Magni (ch.26). In that case, he would have been buried in the sarcophagus in the manner of a Western Roman Emperor.

On the other hand, the historian Dieter Hägermann suspected that the Persephone Sarcophagus was first used to store the bones of Charlemagne in 1165 after the exhumation of Charlemagne's grave by Frederick Barbarossa. Hägermann argued this on the grounds that the sources on Charlemagne's funeral in 814 say nothing of the sarcophagus, but instead speak of the interment of Charlemagne in the floor of the Palatine chapel. Hägermann considered it unlikely that anyone would have just buried such a finely carved marble sarcophagus in the floor of the church.

The reason why someone would have selected a sarcophagus with "heathen" motifs for the burial of a Christian emperor could lie in a Christian interpretation of the Persephone story: the fact that later in the myth Ceres succeeds in bringing Persephone up by her request that her daughter be allowed to return to the Earth for two thirds of the year was perhaps interpreted as a metaphor for the resurrection of Jesus.

By 1215 at the latest, the bones of Charlemagne must have been taken from the sarcophagus, since in this year they are attested in the Karlsschrein. From this time, the empty sarcophagus stood in the lower chamber of the octagon of Aachen Cathedral – only the front side visible through a grill – presumably with the wooden figure of Charlemagne from the 14th century which is now exhibited in the Treasury and was probably part of a so-called Karlsmemorie (Charlemagne Memorial). In 1794, Napoleon Bonaparte had the sarcophagus brought to Paris together with the ancient columns of the cathedral, but in 1815 it returned to Aachen again and was installed in the Nikolauskapelle. From 1843 it was in the Michael gallery of the Nikolauskapelle, which was not accessible to the public. In the attempt to hoist the sarcophagus up to the gallery, it took heavy damage. Since 1979 it has been on display in the Cathedral Schatzkammer.

== Bibliography ==
- Herta Lepie, Georg Minkenberg: Die Schatzkammer des Aachener Domes. Aachen: Brimberg, 1995, ISBN 3-923773-16-1, p. 11.
- Theun-Mathias Schmitt: Proserpina-Sarkophag. In: 799. Kunst und Kultur der Karolingerzeit. Karl der Große und Papst Leo III. in Paderborn. Mainz: von Zabern, 1999, vol. 2, ISBN 3-8053-2456-1, p. 758–763.
- Helmut Jung: Der Persephonesarkophag Karls des Grossen. In: Jahrbuch des Deutschen Archäologischen Instituts 117, 2002. Berlin: de Gruyter, 2004, ISBN 978-3-11-017932-3, p. 283-312.
