= Bust of Charlemagne =

Bust of Charlemagne created in 1350

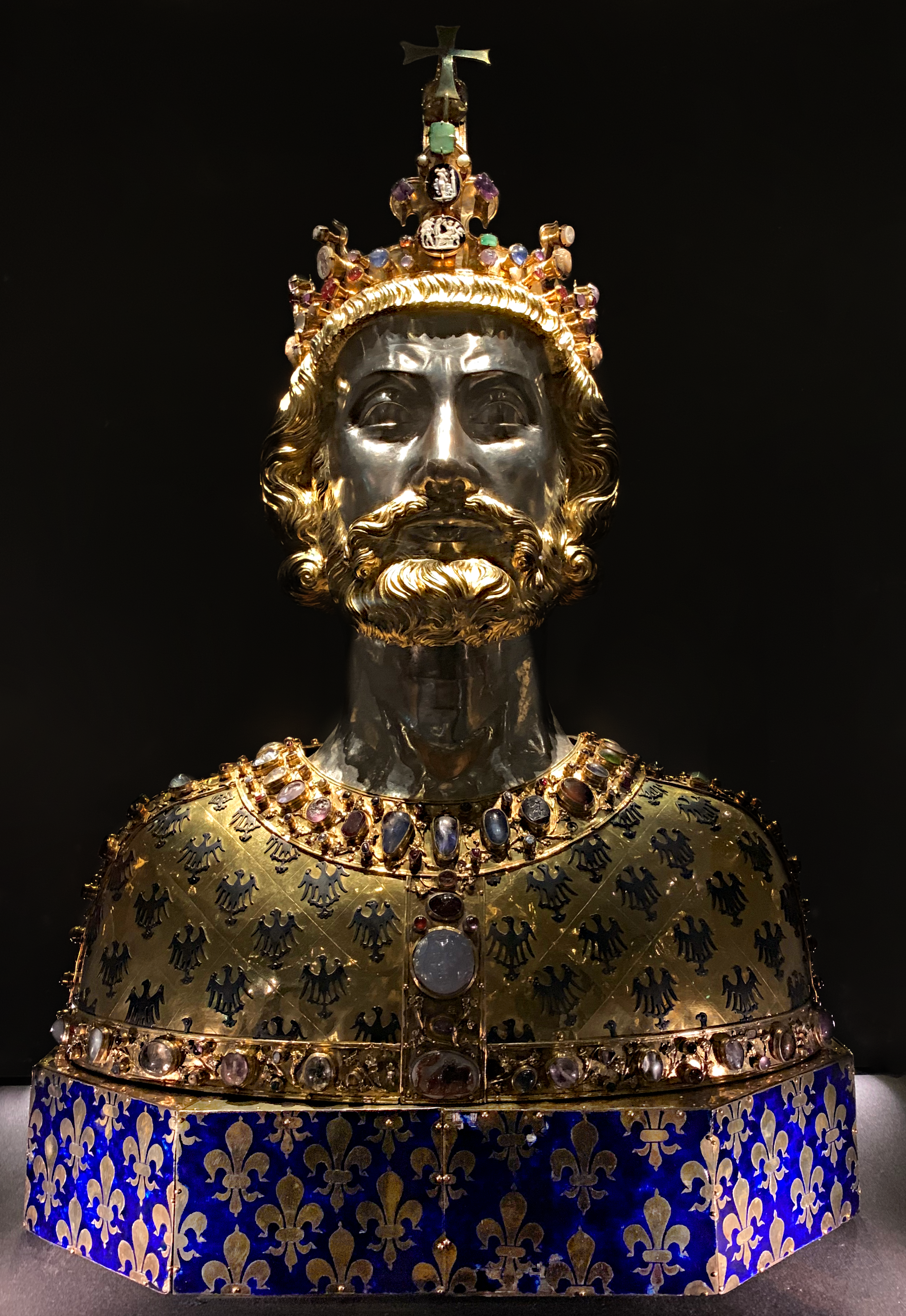
- Bust of Charlemagne (14th century)

- Location in Aachen, Germany
- Year: 1349
- Type: Sculpture
- Medium: gold, silver-gilt, gems, enamel
- Location: Aachen Cathedral, Aachen, Germany; 50°46′29.1″N 6°5′2.12″E

The Bust of Charlemagne (German: Karlsbüste) is a reliquary from around 1350 which contains the top part of Charlemagne's skull. The reliquary is part of the treasure kept in the Aachen Cathedral Treasury. Made in the Mosan region (the valley of the River Meuse), long a centre of high-quality metalwork, the bust is a masterpiece both of late Gothic metalwork and of figural sculpture.

The Bust of Charlemagne, as a masterpiece of Mosan goldwork, initiated a height of silver-gilt naturalistic reliquary busts.

== Description ==
Created 500 years after the death of Charlemagne, the bust is an idealized representation, the facial structure, hair style and fleur-de-lys crown of which reflect 14th-century, not 9th-century fashion style. The skin is chased with silver and partially gilt; hair and beard are gilt. Damascened silver Reichsadler, the heraldic charge of the Holy Roman Empire signifying Charlemagne's imperial dignity, decorate the tunic. The eagles are surrounded by a border of filigree and precious stones, some of which are ancient intaglios. The bust stands on an octagonal pedestal equipped with an opening on either side for a wooden carrying frame and is decorated with fleurs-de-lis, the historical coat of arms of France.

== History ==
According to the Aachen tradition, the Bust of Charlemagne was a donation from Charles IV, who was crowned king in Aachen Cathedral on 25 July 1349. This donation is not mentioned in documentary evidence, but it is considered probable, given Charles IV's deep veneration for Charlemagne. The reliquary is a part of the thirteenth-century French tradition of royal images and depicts an idealised portrait of the Frankish king, although it also has some rather individualised features. These are noticeably similar to a portrait of King John II of France. It is possible that the creator of the reliquary bust, a goldsmith in Aachen, had been trained in his art in France. The reliquary was carried in processions and placed opposite the king at coronations, who was spiritually affirmed in this way as a legitimate successor of Charlemagne. The use of ancient intaglios and cameos on the reliquary indicates the special significance of Ancient Rome to the medieval imperial ideology – both Charlemagne and Charles IV saw their rule as part of that tradition.

Recent historical research holds that it is very probable that Charles IV was crowned with the same crown which is worn by the reliquary – since the Imperial Crown was then in the possession of Charles' rival Louis IV. It is probable that the hoop with its cross was added on the occasion of his coronation. Sigismund of Luxemburg was crowned with the same crown in 1414. A parallel to this crown is seen in the Crown of Saint Wenceslas in Prague, which decorated the reliquary containing the skullcap of St. Wenceslas and was used at Charles IV's coronation as King of Bohemia in 1347.

== Symbolic significance and use ==
On account of its wide recognition value for the City of Aachen and its ideological and artistic significance, a stylised version of the Bust of Charlemagne serves as the central element in the signet of the Foundation of the International Charlemagne Prize of Aachen.

== See also ==
- Iconography of Charlemagne
- Bust of Saint Servatius

== Bibliography ==
- Birgitta Falk. Bildnisreliquiare. Zur Entstehung und Entwicklung der metallenen Kopf-, Büsten- und Halbfigurenreliquiare im Mittelalter. In Aachener Kunstblätter 59, 1991–93, pp. 99–238.
- Herta Lepie, Georg Minkenberg. Die Schatzkammer des Aachener Domes. Brimberg, Aachen 1995, ISBN 3-923773-16-1, p. 27.
