= Marienschrein =

Reliquary in Aachen Cathedral, Aachen, Germany

Coordinates: 50.7747°N 6.0842°E

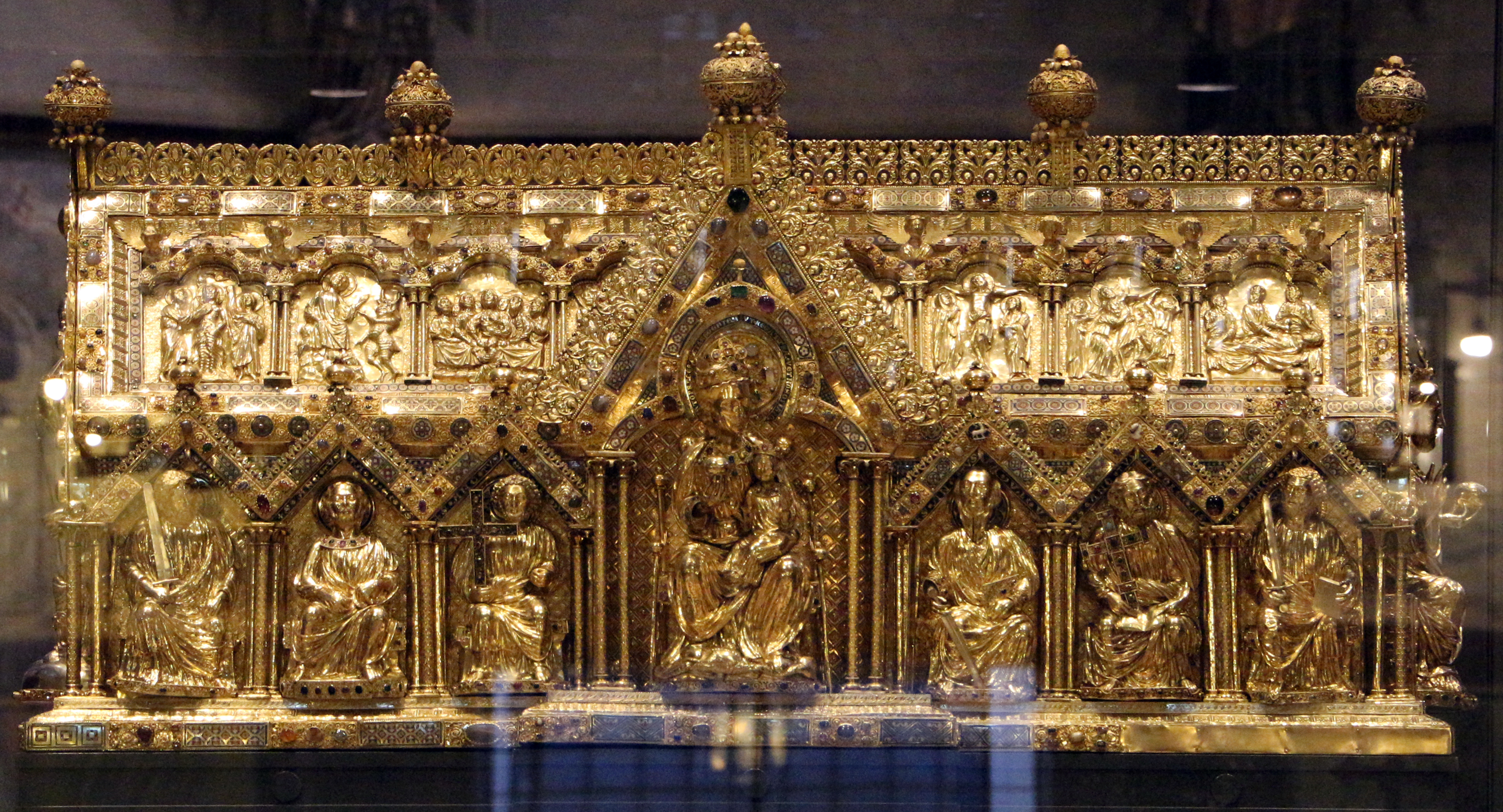
Marienschrein at Aachen Cathedral

The Marienschrein (Shrine of Mary) in Aachen Cathedral is a reliquary, donated on the order of the chapter of Mary around 1220 and consecrated in 1239. Along with the Karlsschrein, the artwork, which is from the transitional period between romanesque and gothic, is among the most important goldsmith works of the thirteenth century.

== Function ==
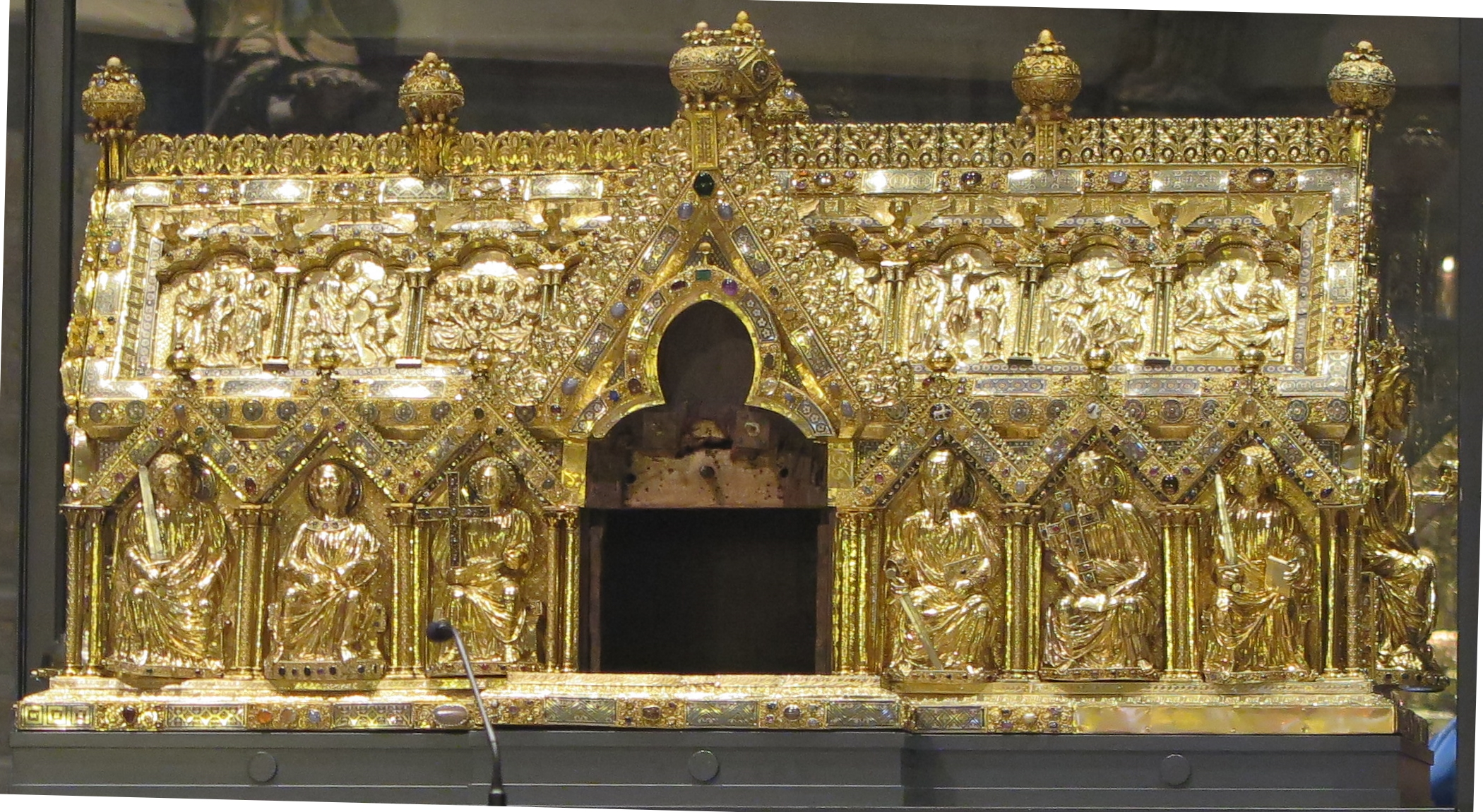
The opened shrine during the Aachen pilgrimage (Heiligtumsfahrt)

After the Dreikönigsschrein in Cologne and the Karlsschrein, the Marienschrein was the last of the three great reliquaries to be completed. The shrine serves as the container of the four great contact relics and objects of pilgrimage in Aachen Cathedral. The relics include: the swaddling clothes and loincloth of Jesus, the dress of Mary and the decapitation cloth of John the Baptist, which have been shown to the congregation and to pilgrims participating in the Aachen pilgrimage every seven years since plague struck in 1349. Until the nineteenth century, it was also the container for the Noli me tangere casket, a silver-gilt casket with mysterious contents.

== Form ==
The shrine takes the form of a single-naved basilica with a short transept. More than a thousand gemstones were used in the creation of the artwork.The shrine shows two distinct styles of work. The earlier, related to that of the Karlsschrein, can be seen on the Charlemagne side and the end with Pope Leo III. The Virgin side shows similarities to sculptures at Chartres Cathedral.

On the shrine's long sides there are fire-gilt figures of the twelve apostles. The four porticos depict: Christ, Mary with the baby Jesus, Pope Leo III and Charlemagne (r. 768–814). The roof shows scenes from the life of Jesus in gold relief.

According to an old tradition, the Marienschrein is sealed with a skilfully manufactured lock, which is then filled with lead. The key is sawn up by master goldsmiths. The head of the key is held by the Cathedral chapter, while the end is taken by the city leaders (the so-called Konkustodienrecht (shared custody arrangement)). At the beginning of each pilgrimage period, however, the lock is broken with a hammer, in order to open the shrine once more.

== Restoration ==
As a result of centuries of wear from pilgrimages and from being carried in processions at those times, the Marienschrein took significant damage. The gilt silver was tarnished, a portion had been lost, another had received only makeshift repairs and had taken many dents, cracks, and holes as a result of the passage of time. Over three thousand parts had to be replaced, cleaned, and repaired. This restoration work was documented at all stages by WDR. Since March 2000, the Marienschrein restored to its former glory once again stands in its place in a glass vitrine in the choir of Aachen Cathedral. Every year it is inspected and removed from the vitrine and cleaned as necessary.

== Gallery ==
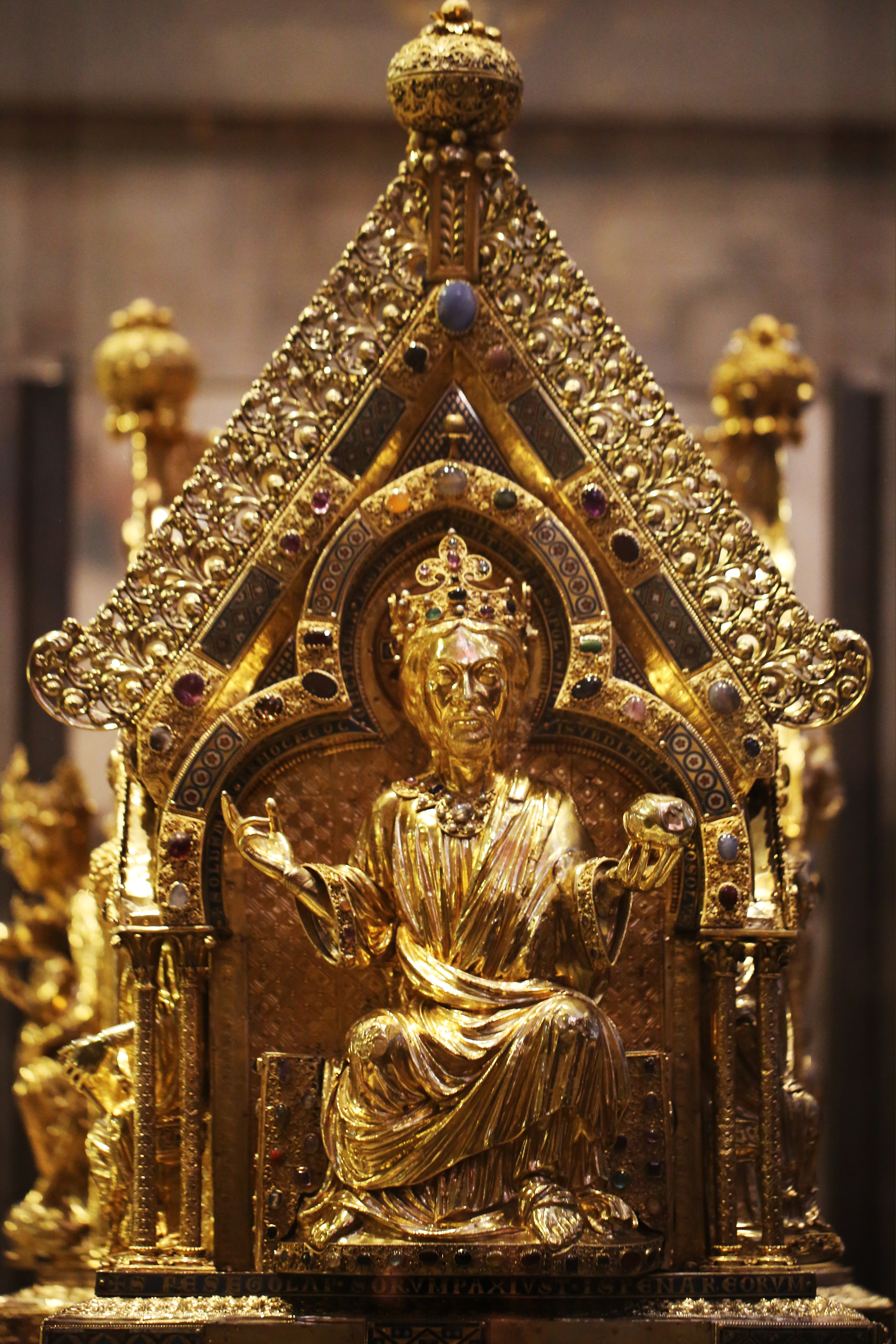
Christ

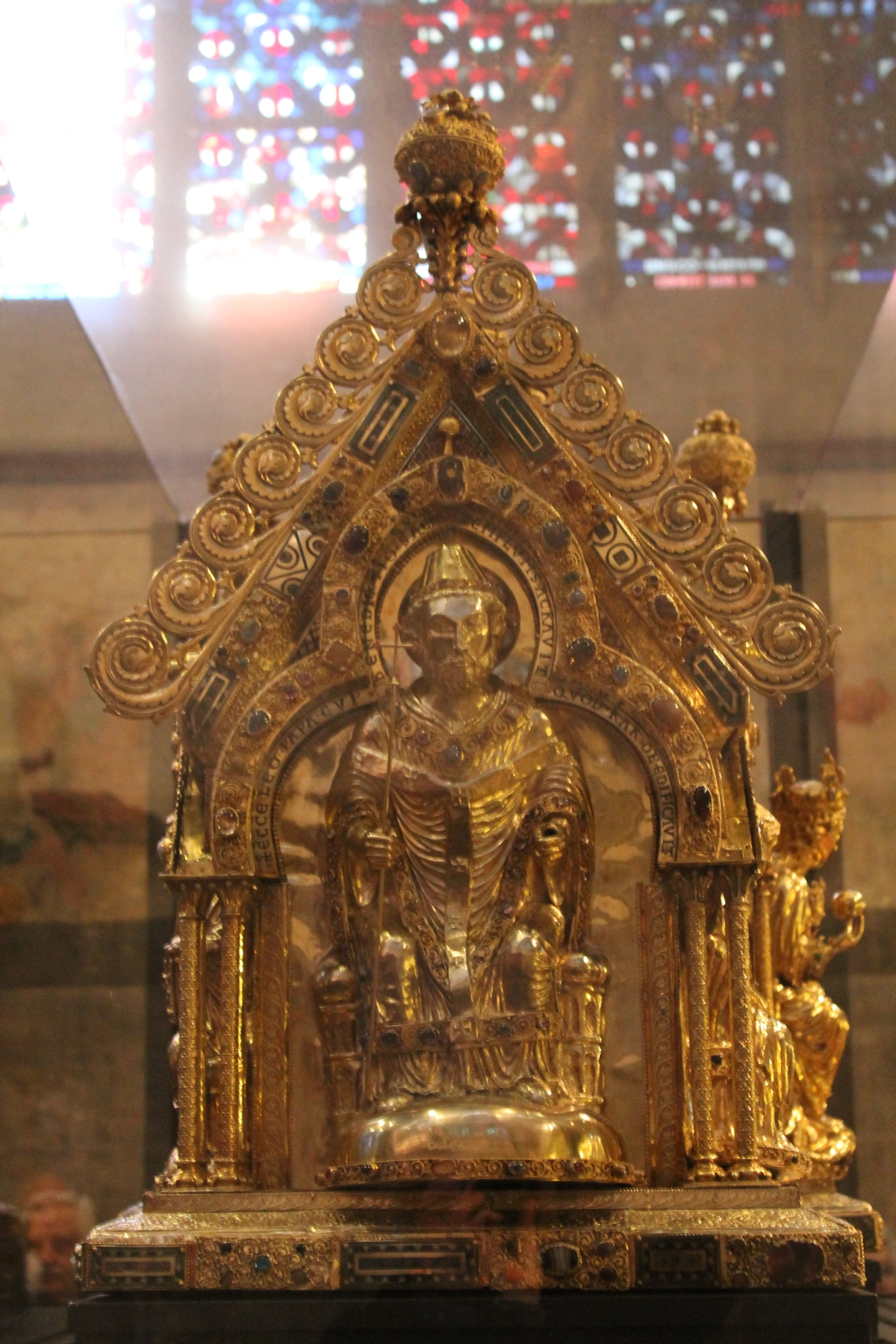
Leo III.

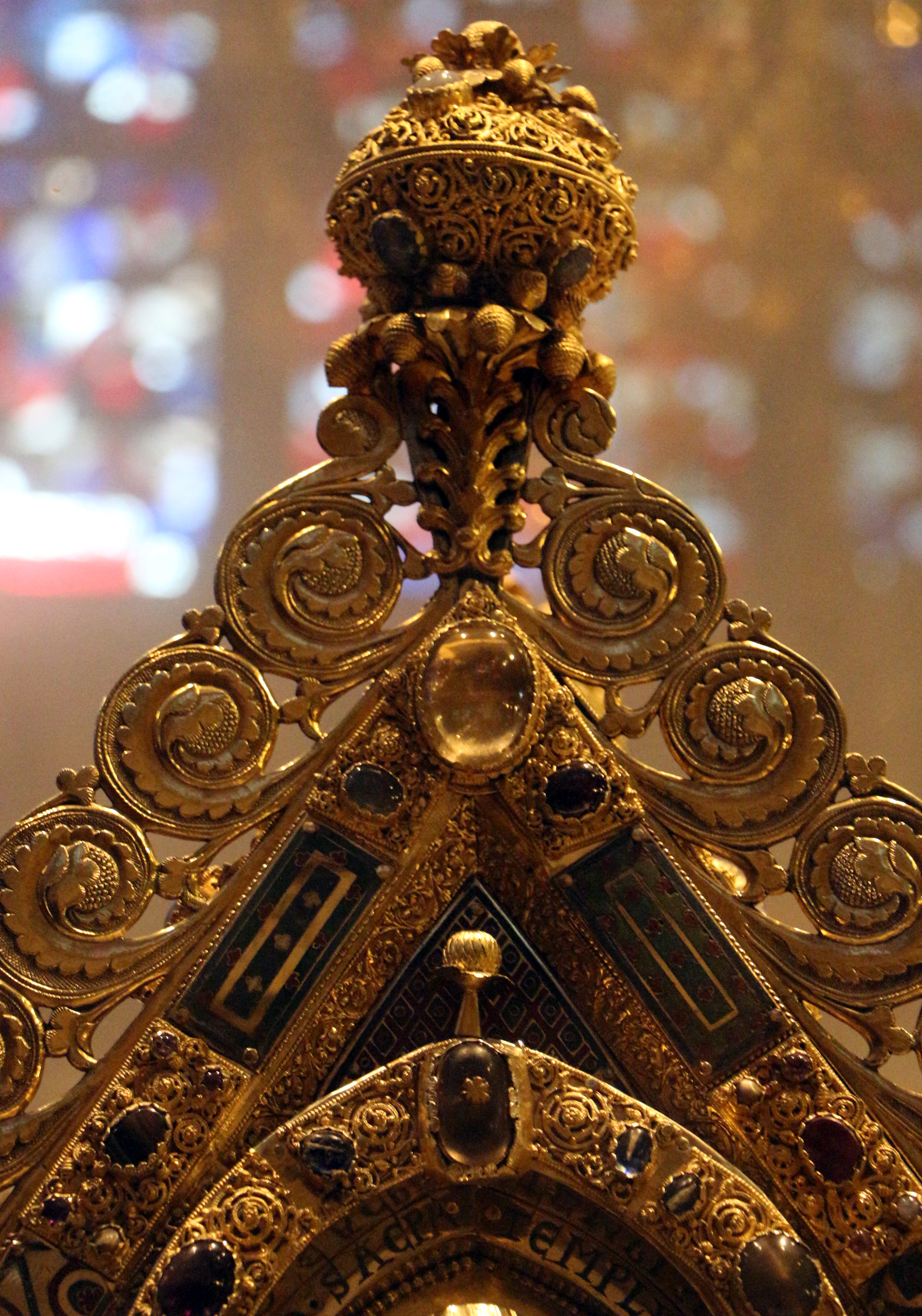
Filigrees and gemstones

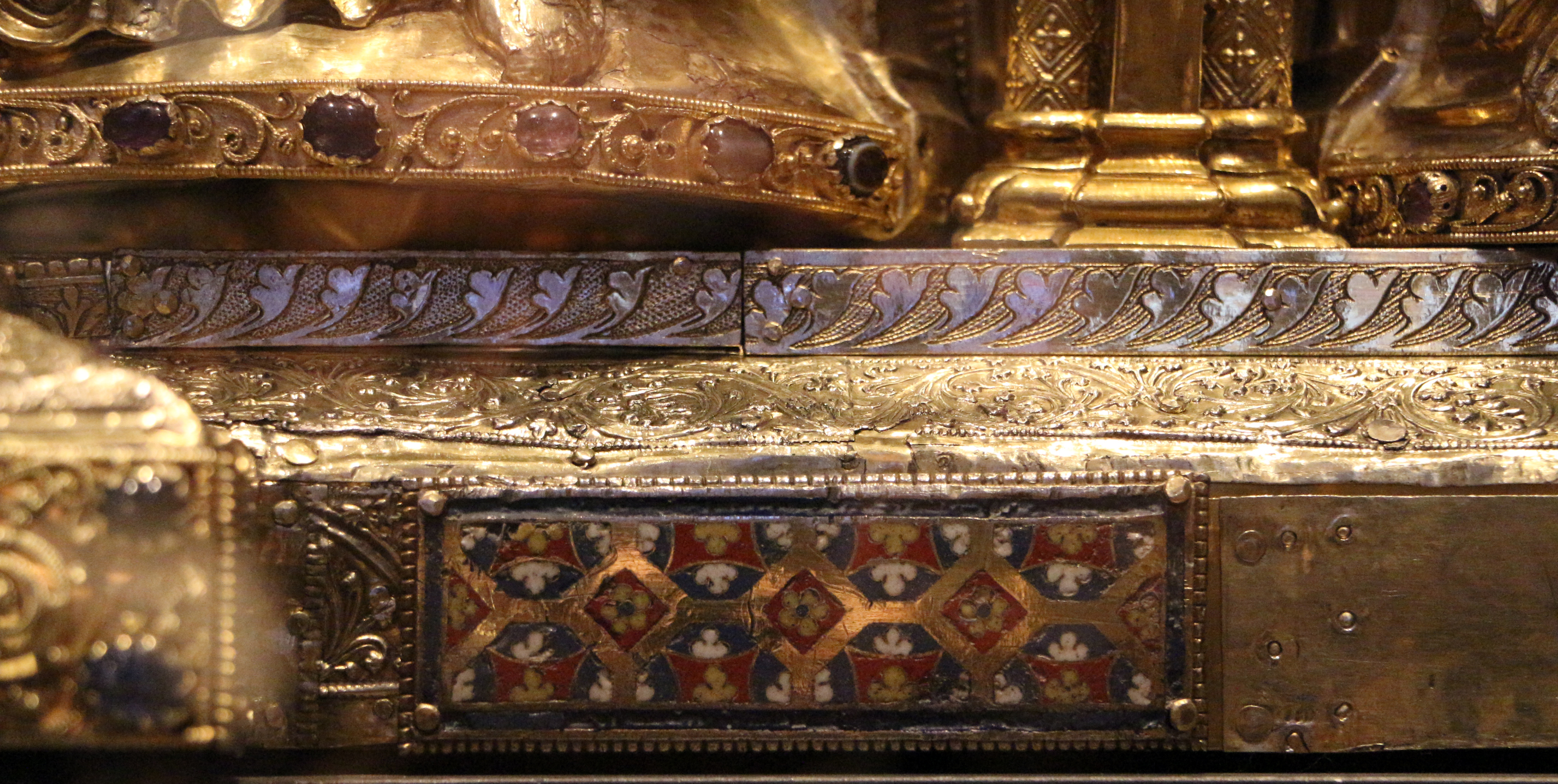
Enamel ornaments

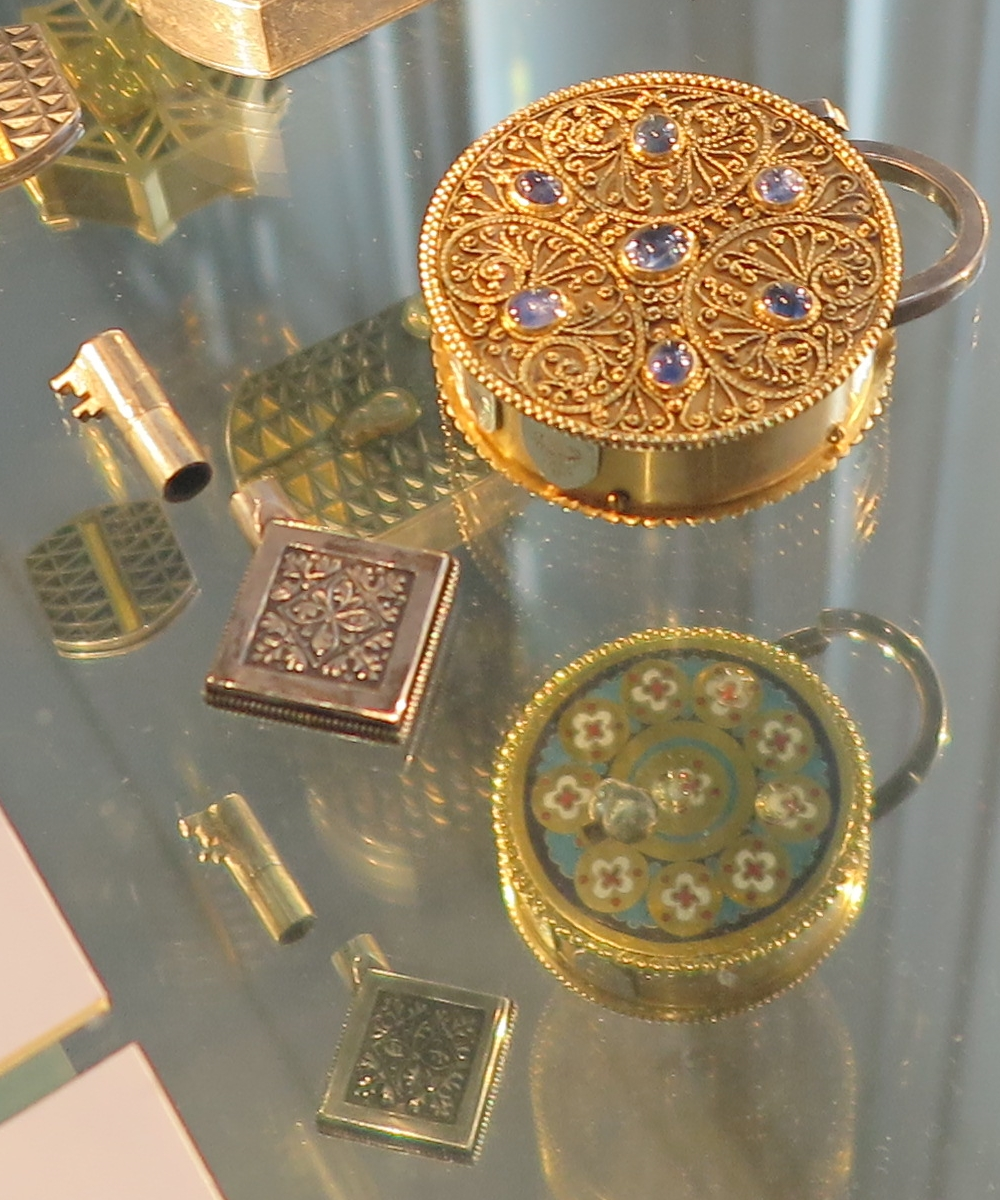
Padlock with sawed key (residing in the Cathedral Treasury)

== Bibliography ==
- Jürgen Fitschen: Die Goldschmiedeplastik des Marienschreins im Aachener Dom. Eine stilgeschichtliche Untersuchung. Lang, Frankfurt a. M. 1998, ISBN 3-631-32584-3.
- Dieter P. J. Wynands (Hrsg.): Der Aachener Marienschrein. Eine Festschrift. Einhard-Verlag, Aachen 2000, ISBN 3-930701-68-5.
- Ernst Günther Grimme: Der Karlsschrein und der Marienschrein im Aachener Dom, Einhard-Verlag, Aachen 2002, ISBN 3-936342-01-6.
- Helga Giersiepen: Die Inschriften des Aachener Doms (= Die Deutschen Inschriften, Band 31). Reichert, Wiesbaden 1992, ISBN 3-88226-511-6, S. 37–39 Nr. 35 (Online).
