= Karl Faymonville =

German art historian

Karl Faymonville (31 August 1875 – after 1927) was a German art historian.

== Life and career ==
Born in Aachen, Faymonville, son of the factory owner Johannes Faymonville, attended a grammar school in Aachen. He studied art history and architecture at the Polytechnische Schule zu Aachen (1894–96), the University of Karlsruhe (TH) (1896-97), the Technical University of Munich and the Ludwig-Maximilians-Universität München (1897–98). From 1898, he studied at the Ruprecht Karl University of Heidelberg, where he received his doctorate in 1899. He became a member of the Corps Marko-Guestphalia Aachen in Aachen. From 1906 onwards, he worked for the inventory of the Rhenish art monuments and published, among others, the volumes on Aachen for Die Kunstdenkmäler der Rheinprovinz.

== Publications ==
- Die Purpurfärberei der verschiedenen Kulturvölker des klassischen Altertums und der frühchristlichen Zeit. Beschreibung und Abbildung der verschiedenen Arten, scalae, des Purpurs, desgleichen von heute noch erhaltenen gemusterten Purpurgeweben im Abendlande. Dissertation, Ruprecht-Karls-Universität Heidelberg, 1900. (with résumé) (Karl Faymonville is available for free viewing and download at the Internet Archive)
- Zur Kritik der Restauration des Aachener Münsters. Beschreibende Darstellung der ältesten Abbildungen seines Inneren. Aachener Verlags- und Druckerei-Gesellschaft, Aachen 1904. (MDZ München)
- Der Dom zu Aachen und seine liturgische Ausstattung vom 9. bis zum 20. Jahrhundert. Kunstgeschichtliche Studie. Bruckmann, Munich 1909.
- Die Kunstdenkmäler der Stadt Aachen., vol. 10.)
  - Volume 1: Das Münster zu Aachen. (Die Kunstdenkmäler der Rheinprovinz, vol. 10, 1.) Schwann, Düsseldorf 1916.
  - Volume 2: Die Kirchen der Stadt Aachen mit Ausnahme des Münsters. (Die Kunstdenkmäler der Rheinprovinz, vol. 10, 2.) Schwann, Düsseldorf 1922.
  - with Joseph Lauren, Richard Pick, Max Schmid-Burgk) vol. 3: Die profanen Denkmäler und die Sammlungen der Stadt Aachen. (Die Kunstdenkmäler der Rheinprovinz, vol. 10, 3.) Schwann, Düsseldorf 1924.
- Die Kunstdenkmäler des Kreises Monschau. (Die Kunstdenkmäler der Rheinprovinz, vol. 11, 1.) Schwann, Düsseldorf 1927.
