= Aachen Cathedral Treasury =

Museum in Germany

Coordinates: 50°46′30.13″N 6°4′58.14″E

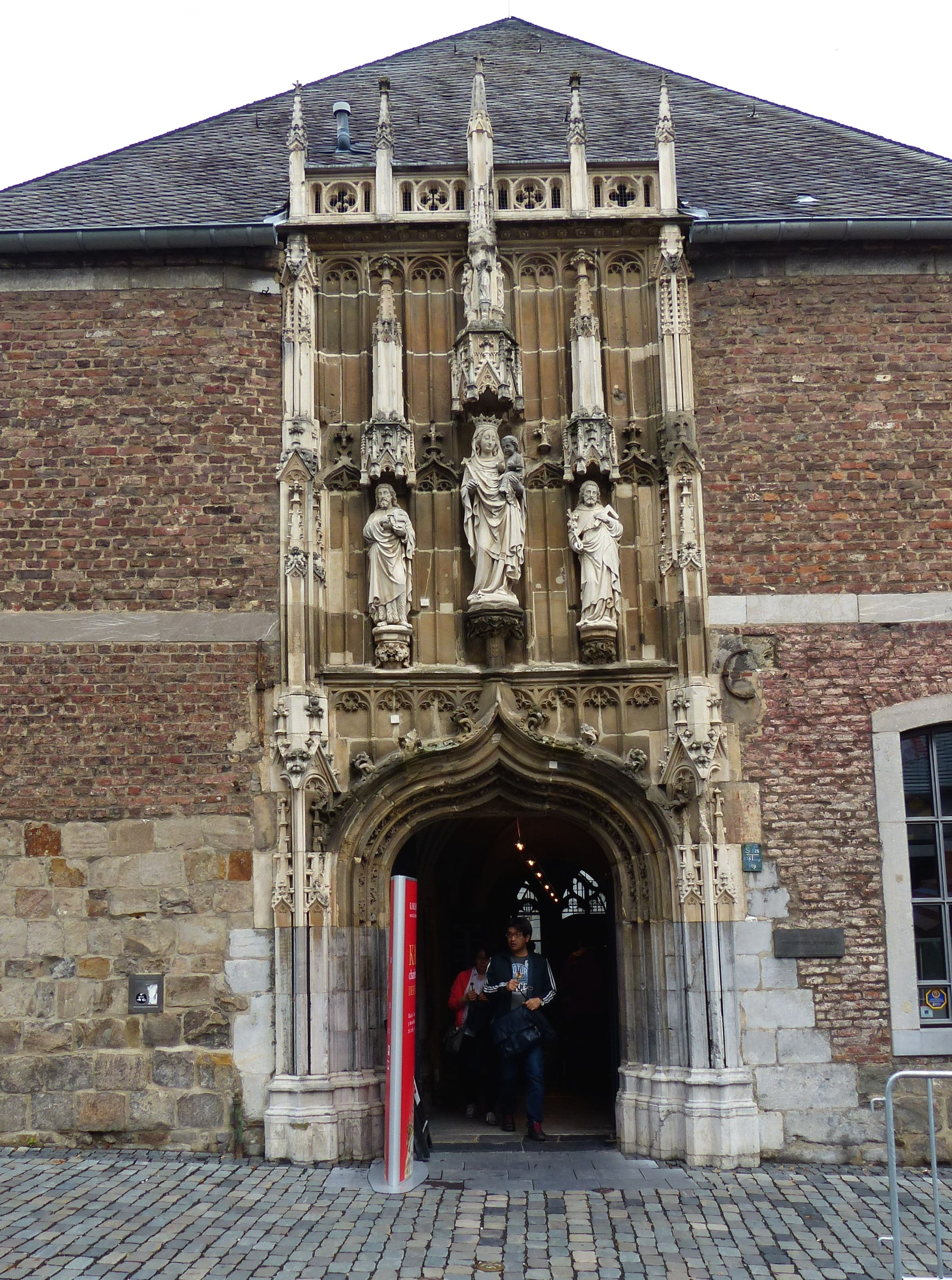
Entrance to the Aachen Cathedral Treasury

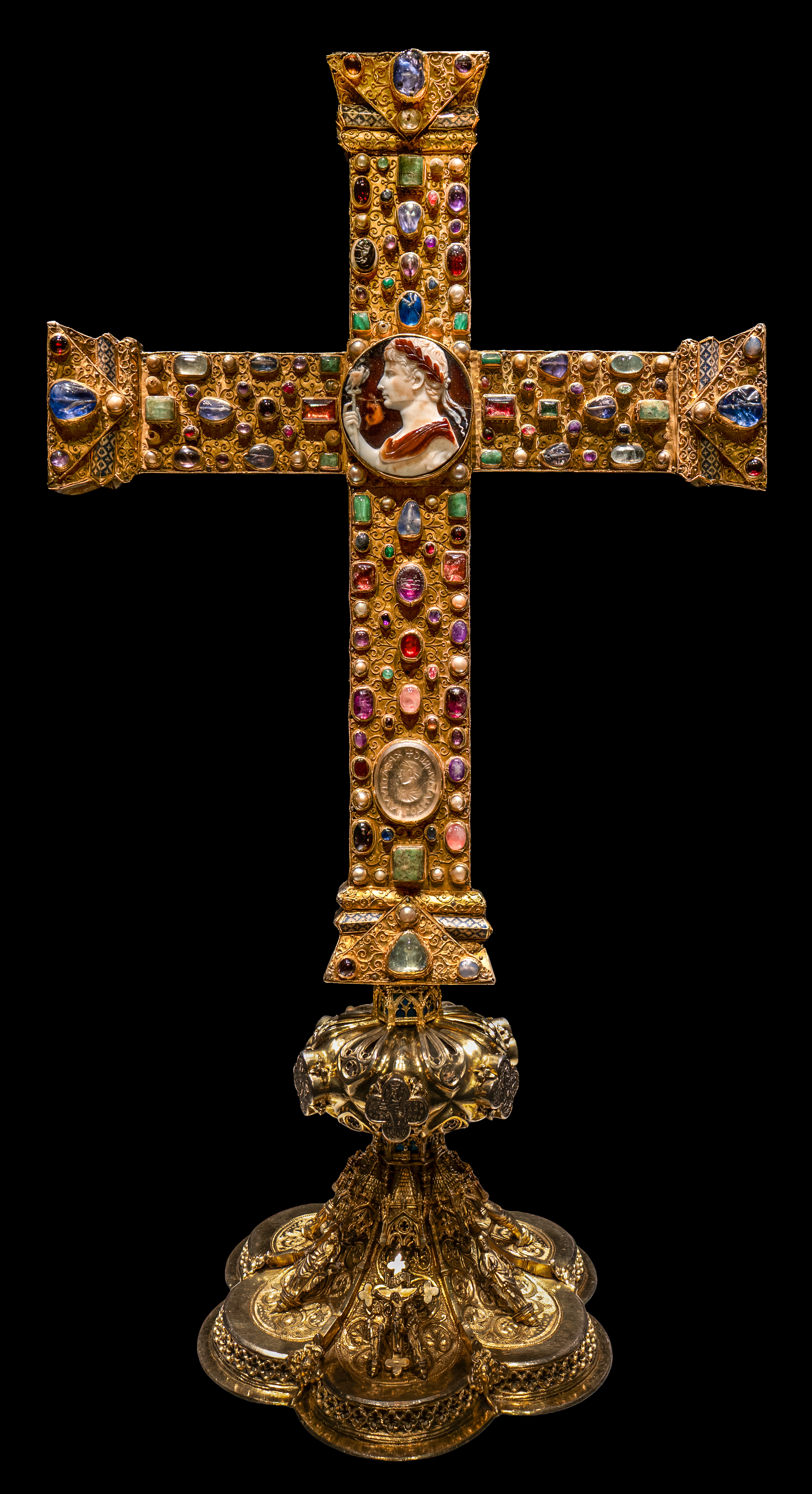
The Ottonian Cross of Lothair

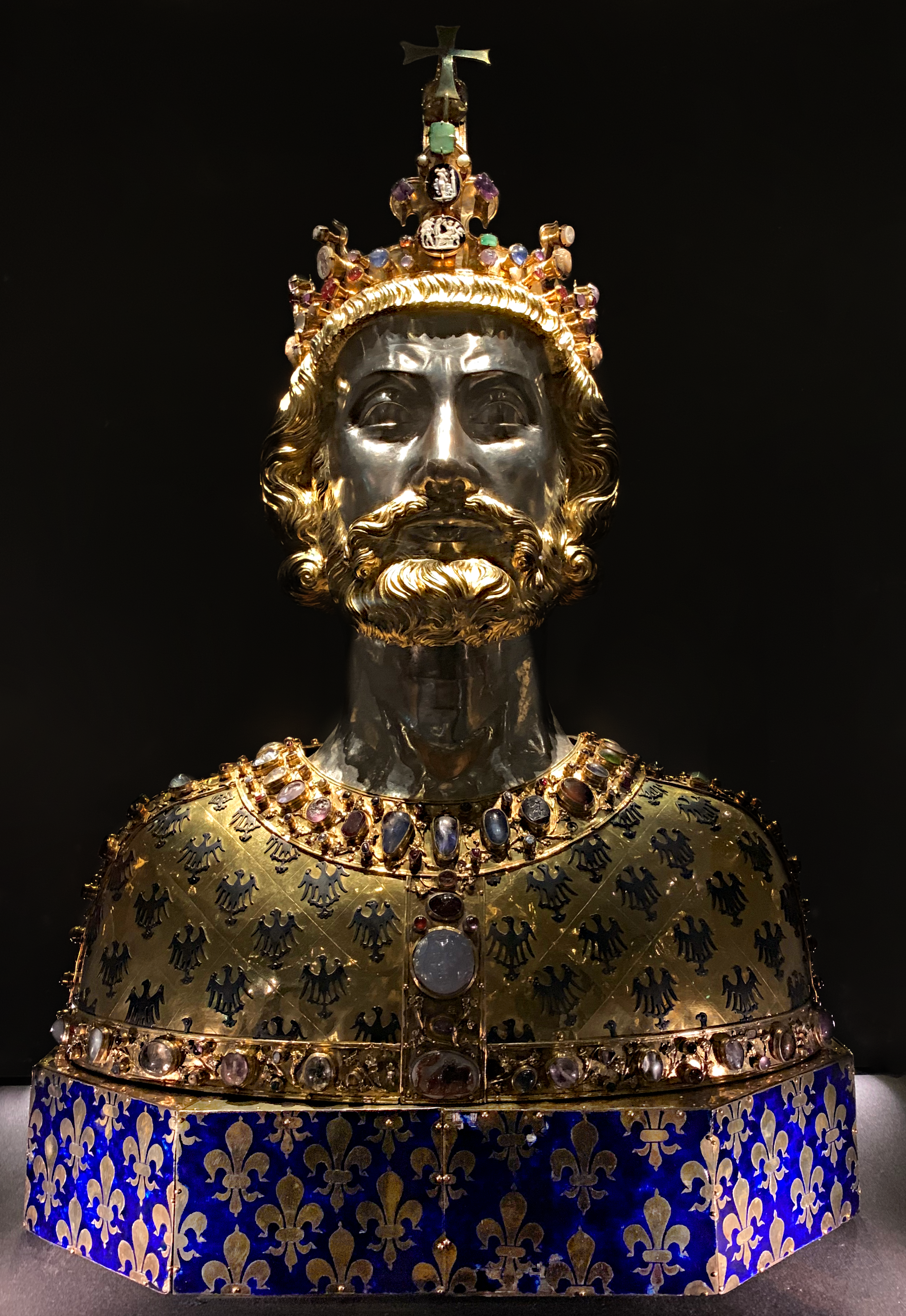
Gothic Bust of Charlemagne

The Aachen Cathedral Treasury (German: Aachener Domschatzkammer) is a museum of the Roman Catholic Diocese of Aachen under the control of the cathedral chapter, which houses one of the most important collections of medieval church artworks in Europe. In 1978, the Aachen Cathedral Treasury, along with Aachen Cathedral, was the first monument on German soil to be entered in the List of UNESCO World Heritage Sites. The treasury contains works from Late Antique, Carolingian, Ottonian, Staufen, and Gothic times. The exhibits are displayed in premises connected to the cathedral cloisters.

== Collection and arrangement ==
In 1995, the Cathedral Treasury was completely refurnished in accordance with the newest conservation and pedagogical knowledge. An area of over 600 m^{2} contains over a hundred artworks, divided into five thematic groups.

One conceptional area is the documentation of the cathedral as the church of Charlemagne. The late gothic silver-gilt Bust of Charlemagne, a model for countless later reliquaries stands in the centre of this section. The Persephone sarcophagus, the Roman marble sarcophagus of the early third century in which Charlemagne was buried in the cathedral is also here.

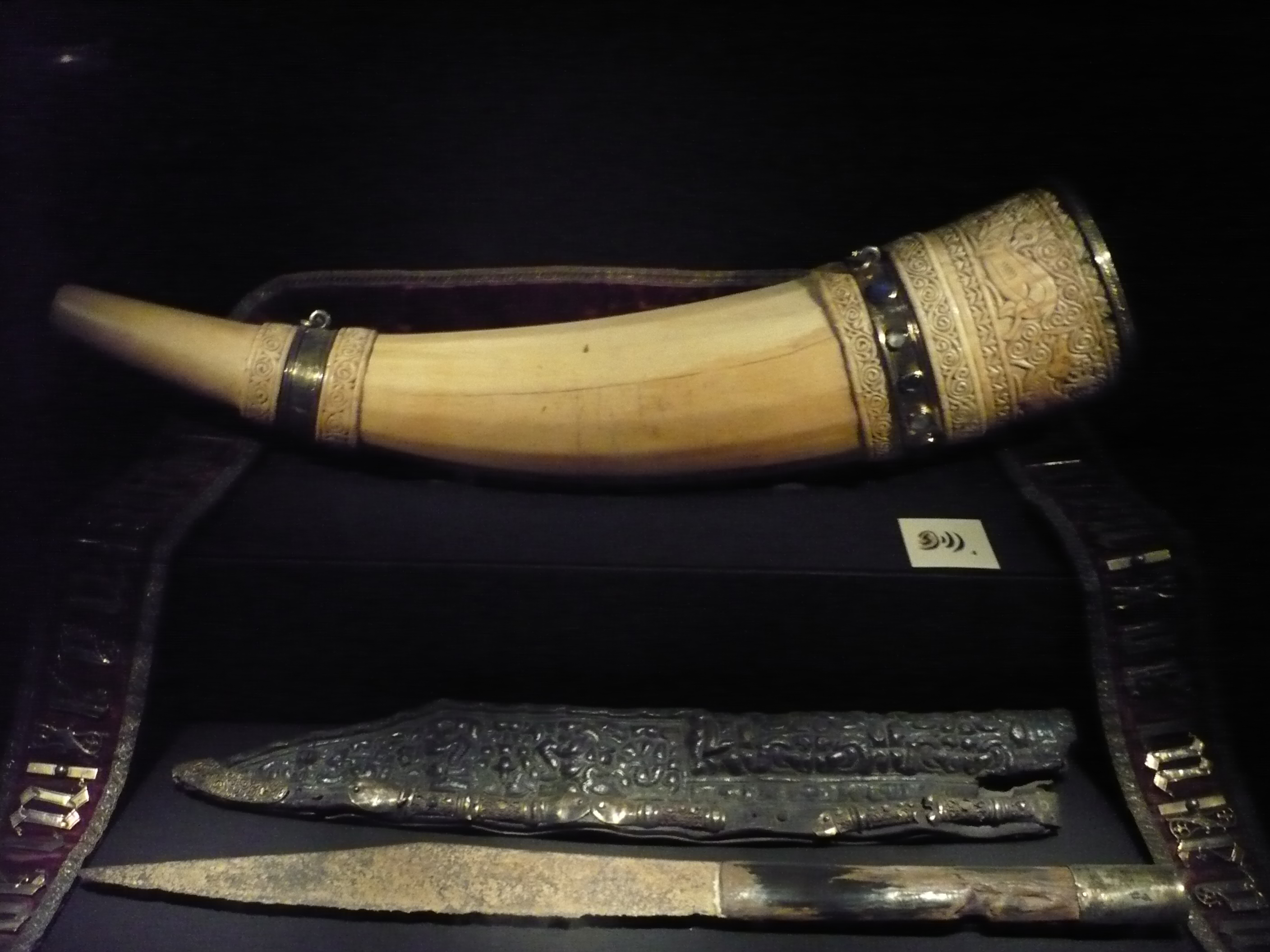
Olifant and the so-called Hunting Knife of Charlemagne (with sheath)

Among the objects in the Cathedral Treasury which were connected with Charlemagne is an Olifant from eleventh century (Saracen) Southern Italy or the east, which was long considered the Hunting Horn of Charlemagne. There is also the so-called Hunting Knife of Charlemagne, dating to the eighth century. It and the Petrusmesser in the Bamberg Cathedral Treasury are the only known Medieval knives that were kept above ground and therefore had a special significance from the beginning. All other similar pieces have been found in archaeological contexts. The hunting knife, made of Damascus steel is classified as Anglo-Saxon or Scandinavian. The associated sheath probably dates to the eleventh century and bears an Old English inscription, reading BRHTZIGE MEC FECID (Brythsige made me).

The second section contains objects connected to the liturgy, including the Cross of Lothair (still used today on special occasions), the Aachen Altar, the Carolingian Treasury Gospels, a masterpiece of medieval illumination. In addition, there is also the late gothic pieces of goldsmith Hans von Reutlingen.

Artworks which were used at Aachen at the coronations of the Holy Roman Emperor between 936 and 1531 form a third thematic category, including the masterfully produced ivory situla, a vessel for Holy water made in Trier around the year 1000 and decorated with rich reliefs, as well as the Ottonian Liuthar Gospels which are exemplary of their period.

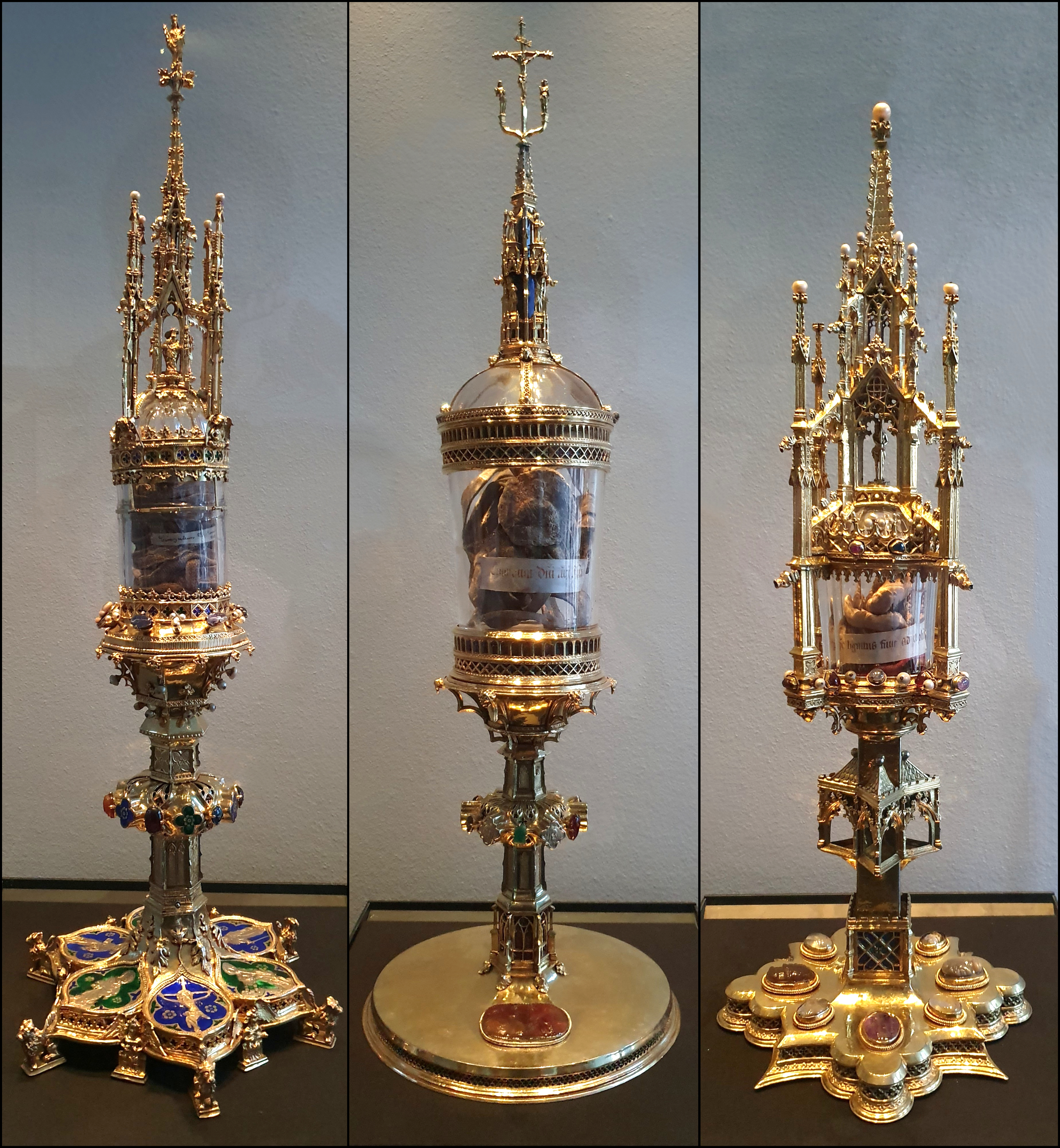
Reliquaries containing the so-called 'three small relics' of Aachen Cathedral Treasury

The relics of the cathedral and the pilgrimage to Aachen (particularly the Aachen pilgrimage) and the cathedral as a church of Mary are the fourth and fifth categories. The reliquaries and the so-called Hungarian Donations, as well as pictures and sculptures of the Theotokos are displayed here. Gems which donors and patrons (often clergy) gave to the cathedral treasury are displayed in vitrines.

Items from the rich textile collection of the treasury are in constant rotation in the basement, with the coronation cloak, the Cappa Leonis (c. 1520), falsely named after Pope Leo III in the centre.

== History ==
=== Treasury ===
"Since I have seen every royal marvel, [I know that] no-one living has seen a more marvellous thing," wrote Albrecht Dürer in his travel diary, when he visited Aachen in 1520 on the occasion of the coronation of Emperor Charles V. By some miracle, the unique collection, the most important north of the Alps, has survived intact in the cathedral and its treasury to this day. Its outstanding position is due to the fact that Aachen Cathedral hosted the coronations of thirty kings of the Romans between 936 and 1531. Only after being anointed at Aachen could the ruler be crowned Holy Roman Emperor in Rome. Countless precious objects entered the collection as royal donations, others were essential parts of the coronation ceremonies.

As they grew over the centuries, the contents had a tumultuous history. They were sent away during the Thirty Years' War and again in 1794 when the French Revolutionary troops occupied Aachen and incorporated it into the département of the Roer. In August of that year the treasure was taken to the Collegium Liborianum, the Capuchin monastery in Paderborn, where the three items of Imperial Regalia hitherto in the possession of the xathedral college (the Carolingian Coronation Gospels, the Sabre of Charlemagne and St. Stephen's Purse were separated and taken to Vienna. Since then the Aachen Imperial Regalia has remained in the Imperial Treasury, Vienna. Disputes over the ownership of these items continue to this day.

In 1804 Marc-Antoine Berdolet, the first Bishop of Aachen, gave two pieces of the collection to Empress Joséphine, when she visited Aachen to bathe, as a thanksgiving for the return of the Treasure to Aachen which had been arranged by her husband Napoleon Bonaparte. Of these gifts, the Staufen arm-reliquary is now in the Louvre in Paris and the Talisman of Charlemagne is in the treasury of Reims Cathedral.

Towards the end of the First World War the treasure was once again taken to Paderborn on account of imminent air raids. It was returned in 1922.

At the beginning of the Second World War, the treasury was taken to Bückeburg Palace along with the treasure of other churches in the diocese and of the Suermondt-Ludwig-Museum. However, the palace soon proved unsuitable for the storage of such important artworks. Therefore, in 1941, Heinrich Himmler had a list of "Items important to the Reich and items unimportant to the Reich" drawn up and the fourteen "Items important to the Reich" were taken to Albrechtsburg in Meissen. These items included the Karlsschrein, the Marienschrein, Bust of Charlemagne, the Cross of Lothar, the ivories, the codices, and the two great Gothic reliquaries (Charlemagne's reliquary and Three Towers reliquary). The rest of the collection was sent back to Aachen Cathedral where they were carefully walled up in the south tower of the Westwerk. At the urging of the Reichskonservator Robert Hiecke and Provinzialkonservator Franz Wolff-Metternich who was in close contact with the cathedral chapter and civic administration, the pieces stored at Albrectsburg were taken to Siegen on 13 September 1944 (as the citizens remaining in Aachen were being evacuated to Thuringia) and were stored there, in Hain Tunnel, along with the Essen Cathedral Treasury, the Trier Cathedral Treasury, the most valuable items of the Rheinish Museums and the wooden doors of St. Maria im Kapitol.

On Easter Monday 1945, the young vicar Erich Stephany, accompanied by the American art protection officer Walker Hancock, set out for Siegen, to inspect the six boxes of stored treasure. On 7 May he left for Siegen again, to bring the treasure back to Aachen. However, the delivery was delayed by the Capitulation of the Wehrmacht signed the same day. The collection was only returned on 26 May thanks to Hancock, who prevented their transfer to Marburg, loaded the treasure, copies of the Imperial Regalia, and the wooden doors of St Maria in a lorry without authorisation and transported them to Aachen and Cologne.

=== Treasury Chamber ===
Until 1979, the treasure was housed in a 90 m^{2} room from Carolingian times on the east side of the cloisters. In 1975, on account of the significance of the Aachen Cathedral Treasury, the Federal Ministry of Regional Planning, Building and Urban Development decided to erect a Test Bunker for the Protection of Artefacts. Because only a short journey could guarantee a safe transfer in an emergency, the cathedral chapter decided to build a new treasury on the west side of the cloisters in the immediate proximity of the bunker. Planning and construction took place from 1975 to 1979. In 1979 the new exhibition room came into service. The items were exhibited to the public in chronological order in three rooms with a floorspace of 490 m^{2}. In time, however, technical shortcomings presented themselves, which endangered the masterpieces. Therefore, a new arrangement was organised in 1995, to meet conservation, technical, and safety requirements.

== See also ==
- Essen Cathedral Treasury
- Trier Cathedral Treasury
- Cologne Cathedral Treasury
- Liège Cathedral Treasury
- Treasury of the Basilica of Saint Servatius
- Imperial Treasury, Vienna

== Bibliography ==
- Franz Bock, Karls des Grossen Pfalzkapelle und ihre Kunstschätze: Kunstgeschichtliche Beschreibung des karolingischen Octogons zu Aachen, etc. Cologne – Neuß, 1866.
- Karl Faymonville, Das Münster zu Aachen (Die Kunstdenkmäler der Stadt Aachen vol. 1). Düsseldorf: Schwann, 1916.
- Ernst Günther Grimme, Der Aachener Domschatz. 2nd edition, Düsseldorf: Schwann, 1973.
- Otto Müller (Ed.), Der Aachener Domschatz. Königstein im Taunus: Langewiesche, 1976, ISBN 3-7845-0123-0.
- Herta Lepie, Die Domschatzkammer zu Aachen. Aachen: Aachen Cathedral Chapter, 1990.
- Herta Lepie, Georg Minkenberg, Die Schatzkammer des Aachener Domes. Aachen: Brimberg, 1995, ISBN 3-923773-16-1.
- Herta Lepie, Elfenbeinkunst aus dem Aachener Domschatz. Petersberg: Imhof, 2006, ISBN 3-86568-000-3.
- Herta Lepie, Georg Minkenberg, Der Domschatz zu Aachen. Regensburg: Schnell & Steiner, 2010, ISBN 3-795423-20-1.
