= Hans von Reutlingen =

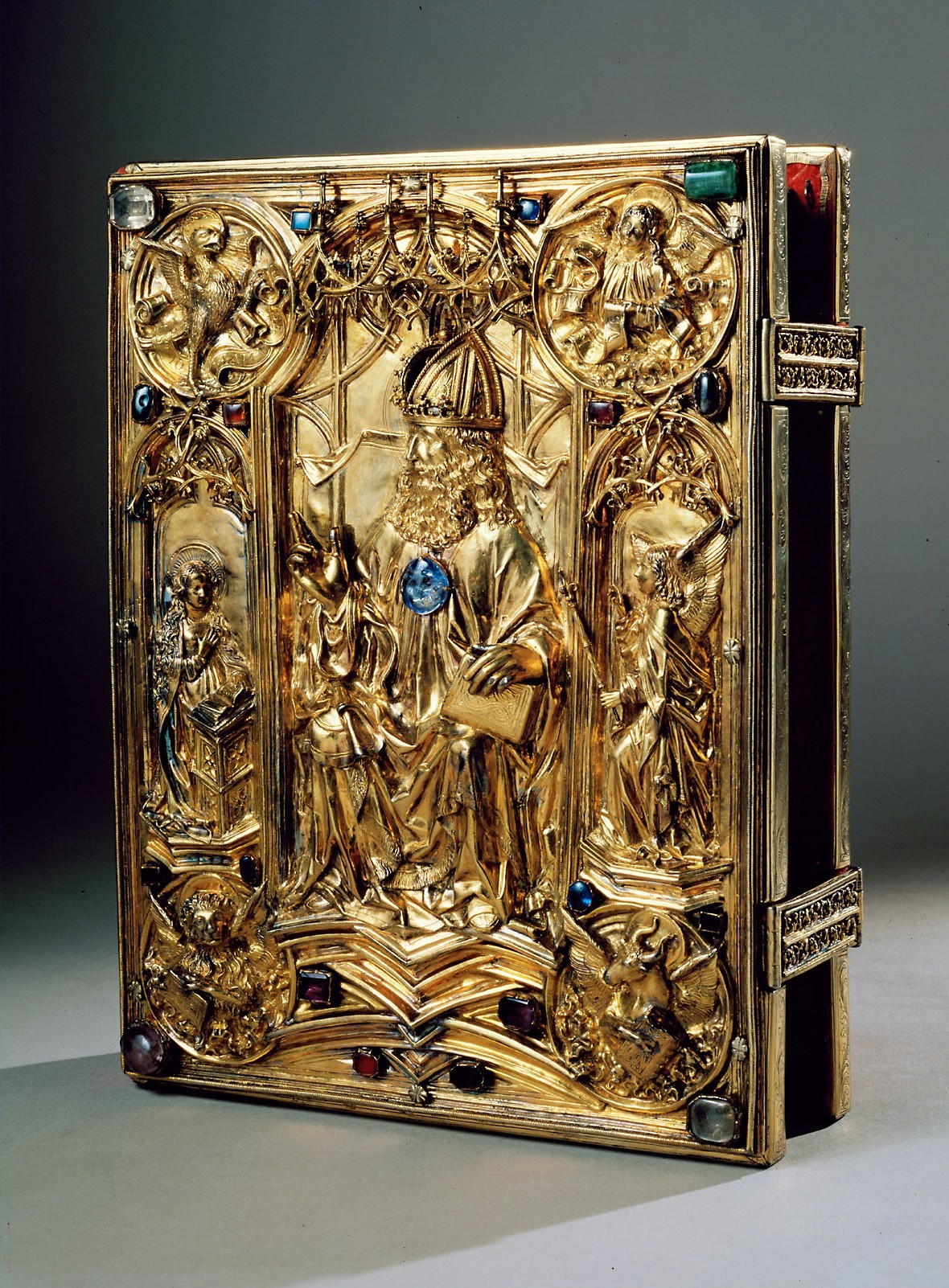
15502 SK WS XIII 18.jpg

Hans von Reutlingen (1465-1547) was a German goldsmith and seal engraver who was born in, lived, and plied his trade in the city of Aachen. He worked under the patronage of Maximilian I, Holy Roman Emperor and Charles V, Holy Roman Emperor. The Metropolitan Museum of Art holds one of his works, a gold-gilted bishop statuette. Some of his pieces are also housed in the Aachen Cathedral.

"Hans of Reutlingen, who worked in Aachen, was one of the most important goldsmiths working at the change from the Gothic to the Renaissance period. His importance is expressed by the fact that he cut the imperial seals for Maximilian I, Holy Roman Emperor and Charles V, Holy Roman Emperor. In addition to that, he fashioned numerous objects for religious use."
