= Master of the Legend of Saint Ursula (Cologne) =

German Renaissance painter

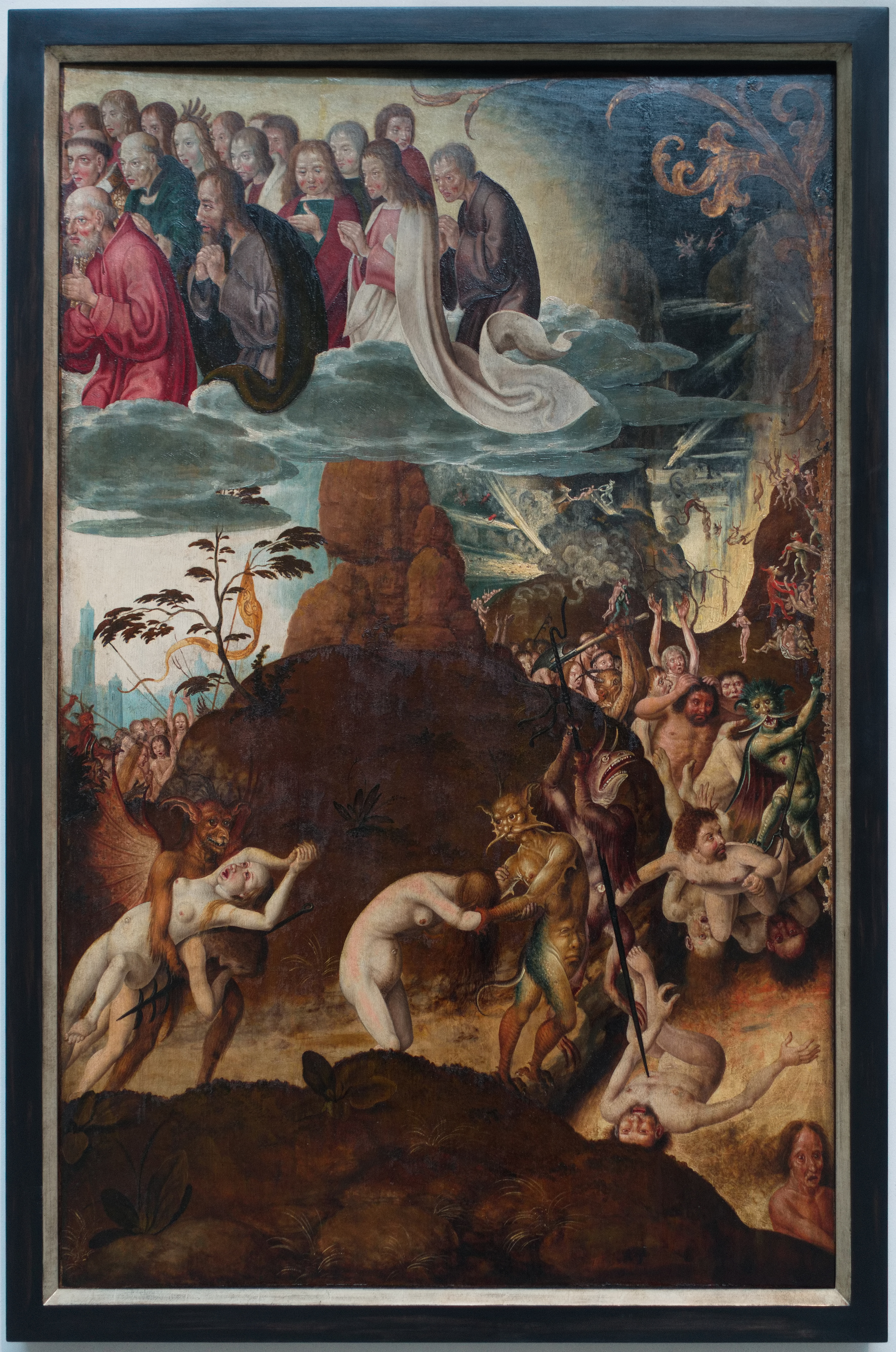
The Last Judgement, c. 1500, Kolumba, Cologne

The Master of the Cologne Legend of St. Ursula (German: Meister der Kölner Ursula-Legende; active 1489–1515) was a German Renaissance painter.

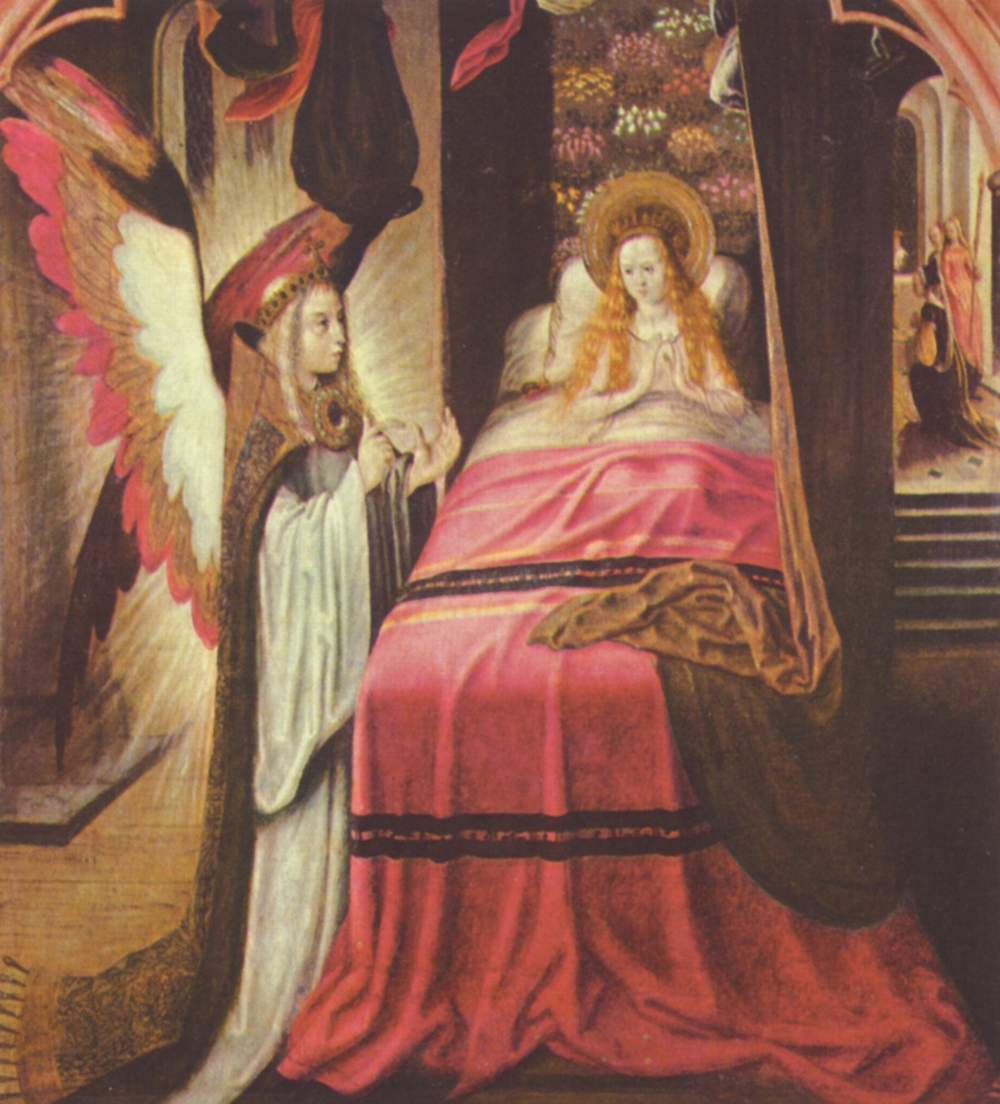
St. Ursula with an angel

== Biography ==
He was named Meister der Kölner Ursula-Legende after a series of paintings depicting the life of Saint Ursula once found in the Basilica of St. Severin, Cologne. Since World War II, when much of the series was lost, the remaining fragments of paintings have been scattered in various museums.

He is not to be confused with the Master of St. Severin, also from Cologne, who worked in the same period, or with the Bruges master named for a different version of the life of Ursula.
