= Essen Cathedral Treasury Hs. 1 =

Parchment manuscript created c. 800 CE

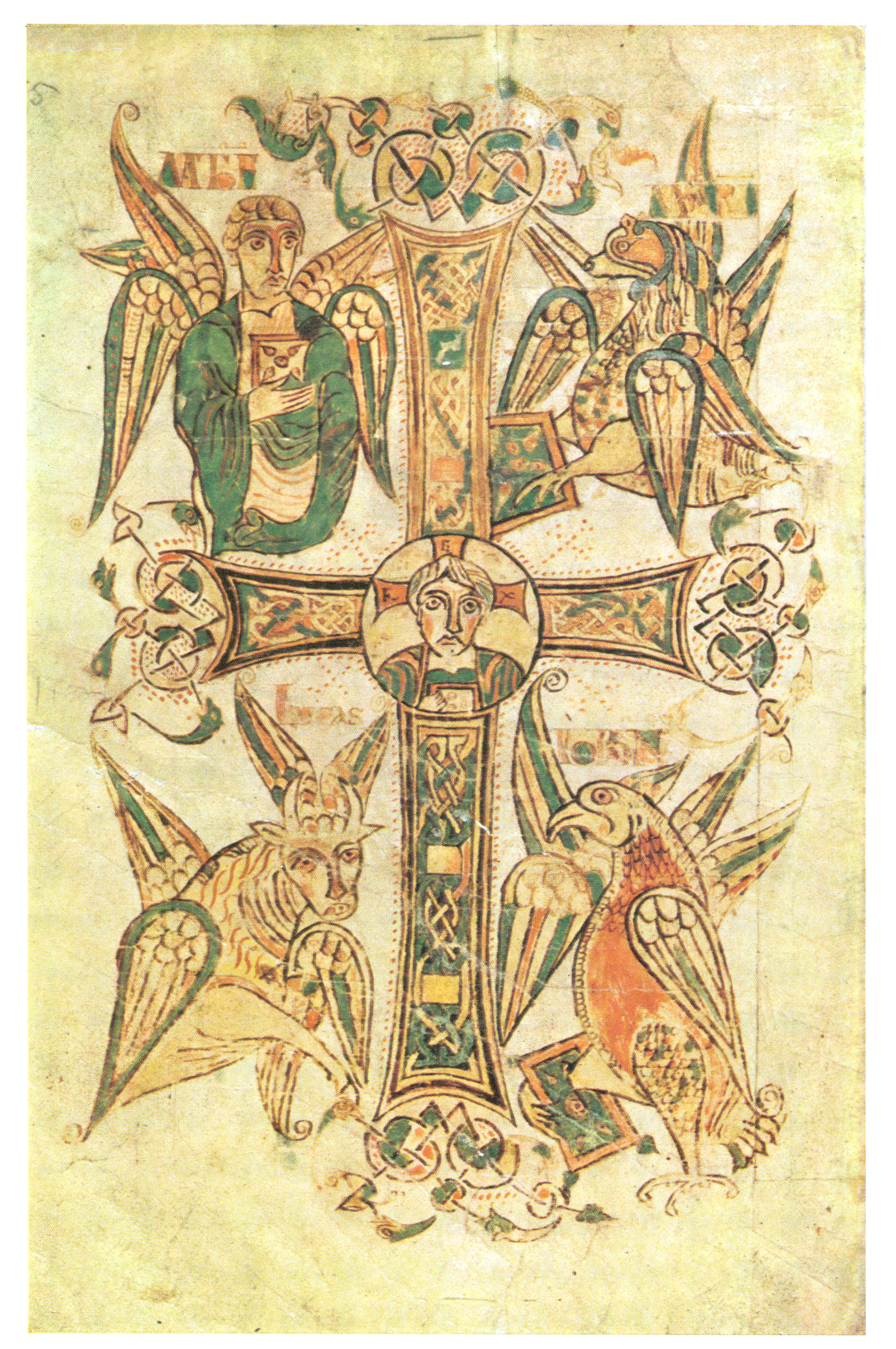
Folio 29v of the manuscript: Cross surrounded by the symbols of the four evangelists

The manuscript Essen Cathedral Treasury Hs. 1, often referred to as the Great Carolingian Gospels or Altfrid Gospels, is a parchment manuscript from the Essen Cathedral Treasury. It was created around the year 800 and has possibly been in Essen since the foundation of the Essen convent around 850. The Gospels contain over a thousand glosses in Latin, Old Saxon, and Old High German.

== Description ==
The manuscript measures 32.5 cm high and 23.0 cm wide and has been bound between wooden covers covered with grey suede and decorated with stamp embossing since the last restoration in 1987. It is completely preserved and comprises 188 folios of vellum in 28 sections, with a small-format (17 × 23 cm) homiliary fragment bound in. The sections are mostly quaternions, consisting of four folded and interleaved sheets of parchment, which make up eight folios (= 16 pages). The writing space of the gospel book measures 26.5 cm in height and 16 cm in width. The text has 38 lines up to fol. 12v, the end of the list of pericope, and 30 lines thereafter. It was provided with numerous glosses in Latin, Old Saxon and Old High German in the 10th century.

Some folios have been trimmed at the margins, resulting in the loss of parts of individual glosses. Glosses were also damaged by the use of chemicals intended to improve legibility. During a restoration in 1958, individual folios were rebounded incorrectly: The double-leaf 48v/49r was folded in the wrong direction and the double-leaf 143v/144r was bound into the 21st instead of the 22nd quire.

The manuscript contains a list of pericopes, Jerome's letter Novum opus to Pope Damasus I in Latin, Jerome's preface plures fuisse to the Gospels, the four prefaces to the individual Gospels and the text of the Gospels, as well as 14 canon tables and an incomplete Ordo lectorum by the same hand that added most of the glosses. The bound homiliary contains extracts from various texts by Beda Venerabilis. The text of the Gospels was written by three different scribes in brown ink; the script is an early version of the Carolingian minuscule. A capitalis quadrata was used to emphasise the different sections. The uncial was only used in the Gospel of Matthew for the beginnings of chapters, the genealogy of Christ and the Lord's Prayer. The headings are coloured in yellow, red and green. The book decoration is polychrome and includes decorative pages, canon tables, incipit and initial pages as well as initials of different designs and sizes. The colours used are red and copper green, the yellow colour has not yet been investigated.

== Book illumination ==
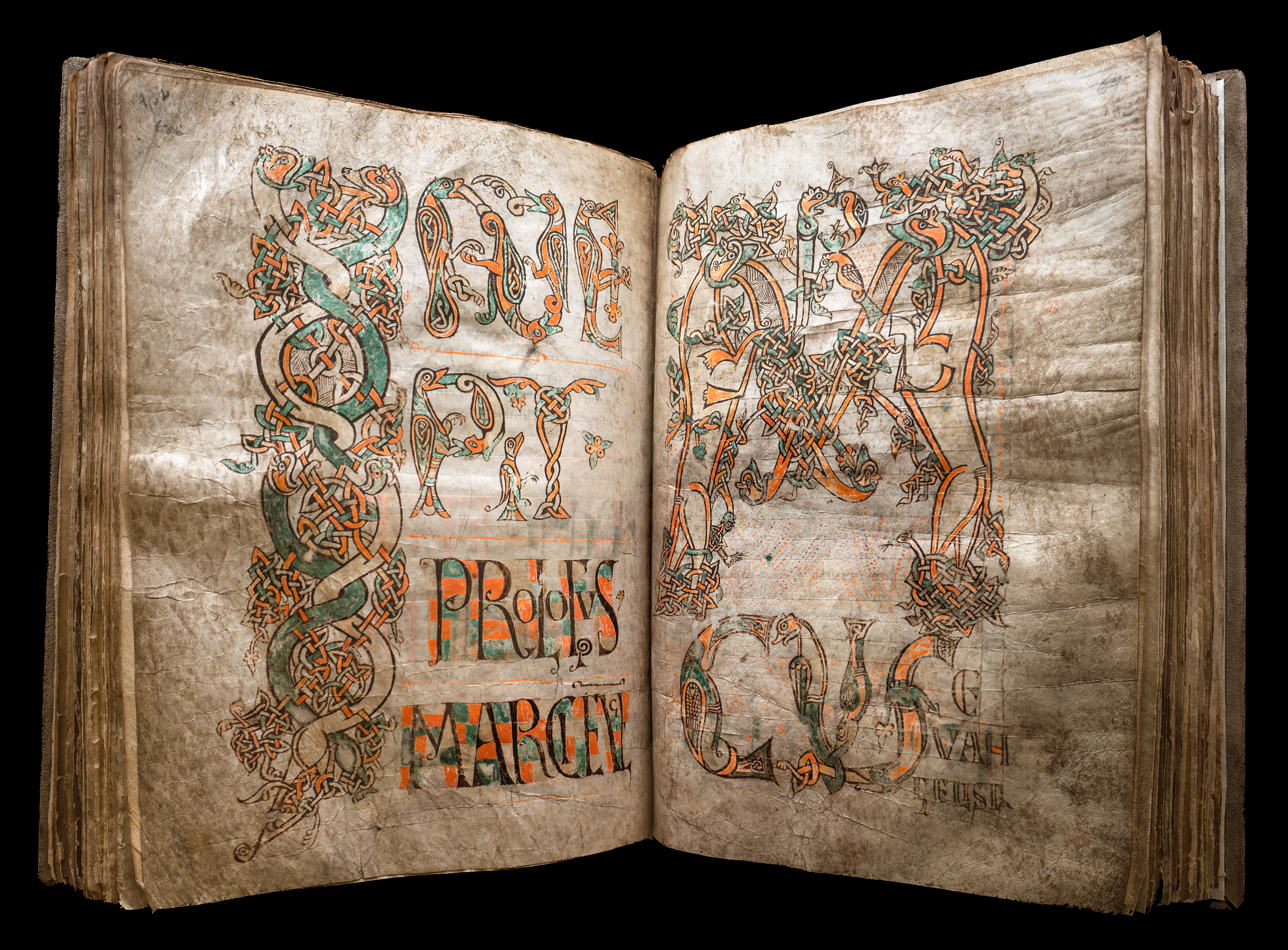
Folio 68v: Opening page of the preface to the Gospel of Mark. Initial I is formed from two symmetrically intertwined worm-like mythical creatures, which are spun into a crisscrossing braided band. The word "Incipit" is formed by zoomorphic motifs, the majuscules of the following words are highlighted in colour.

Georg Humann wrote in 1904 in his work on the treasures of Essen Minster:

Although most of these drawings are of very low aesthetic quality, they are nevertheless of art-historical value, as they offer very characteristic examples of pre-Carolingian book illumination.

The manuscript's illumination was also later described as having a "barbaric taste" or "barbaric splendour".

The manuscript's book decoration is extraordinarily varied and interspersed with influences from several cultures. The decorative letters, parts of which have been replaced by dog and bird-like figures, are striking. These decorative letters can be traced back to the fish-bird letters of Merovingian book art of the 7th and 8th centuries. The initials, on the other hand, often feature braided band ornaments derived from Irish Anglo-Saxon motifs. These ornaments in the Essen manuscript are identical in form to the so-called Psalter of Charlemagne (Bibliothèque nationale de France, ms. lat. 13159), which can be dated between 795 and 800. The use of different decorative forms in one manuscript was not unusual in Carolingian book illumination. The ornamental character of the depiction is untouched by the Carolingian Renaissance, which included a return to ancient models and gave more space to the depiction of man.

The illuminator designed the manuscript's canon panels differently: arcades are formed with round arches or pediments made of ribbon strips or ribbon interlacing, which are decorated with borders of leaf patterns. One of the canon tables has an identical ornament as a pillar filling to the Gundohinus Gospels (Autun, Bibliothèque Municipale. Ms 3), to which there are also similarities in the design of the round arches. Among the decorative sides, the depiction of the cross with the bust of Christ at the intersection of the arms of the cross and the symbols of the Evangelists between the arms of the cross is particularly striking. This miniature shows particularly clear Irish influences in the faces. The low foreheads, the eyebrows drawn in line with the nose, the wide-open eyes and the mouths are similar to the 8th-century ribbon crucifix on p. 266 of Codex Sangallensis 51 in the Abbey Library of St. Gall. The design of the cross in Hs. 1 with coloured rectangles suggests precious stones, so the basic idea of the depiction is a "crux gemmata" The depiction therefore does not refer to the crucifixion as an event, but to Christ, who "entered into his glory" through the cross.

== The glosses ==
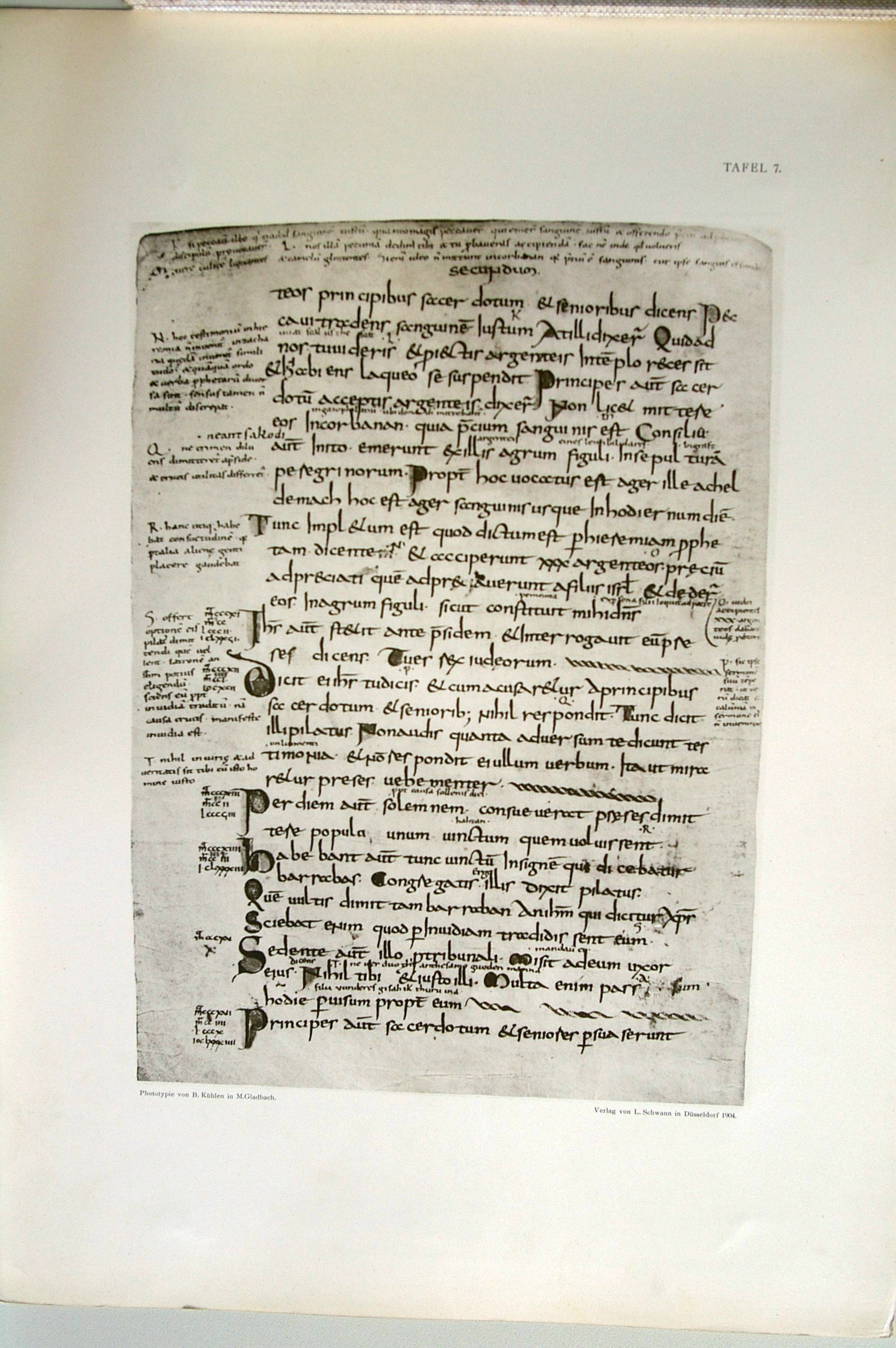
One page of text (fol. 65r) with glossing (scan from Georg Humann's Tafelwerk of 1904), the text is Mt 27,3-21

The total of 453 Old Saxon glosses in the Gospels date from the 10th century. They provide over 1050 individual vernacular words of the time, making the Evangeliary the second most comprehensive glossing of Old Saxon. Most glosses were written by one hand with a strongly varying style, sometimes marginally in the outer margin, sometimes between the lines (interlinear). If there was not enough space, the scribe also used the inner margin. In terms of content, the glossing follows an unknown, lost model, to which the glossing of a Lindau Gospel Book (Baron M. Lochner von Hüttenbach, Codex L, present-day whereabouts unknown), which also originated in the Essen scriptorium, can be traced back. The glosses are distributed unevenly across all four Gospels: 109 interlinear and 78 marginal glosses explain the Gospel of Matthew, whereas the Gospel of Mark is only provided with 15 interlinear and 12 marginal glosses. Of the 148 glosses in the Gospel of Luke, 87 are interlinear and 61 marginal, while the Gospel according to John is supplemented by 34 interlinear and 57 marginal glosses.

The Latin glosses are mostly scholia and consist of linguistically simplified extracts from Carolingian and pre-Carolingian commentaries on the Gospels, especially from the writings of Beda. The annotated passages of the Gospel text were labelled with uncial letters, which recur in the glosses and thus ensure that the annotation is assigned to the annotated passage. As soon as the letters of the alphabet are used up, the next annotation is labelled "A" again. At the same time as the Latin glosses were entered, individual German words were entered after rarely used words. In a second editing phase, the Latin glosses were corrected and partially supplemented, and further German additions were made to the scholia. In this editing section, the Latin glosses were also supplemented at their end. These glosses refer to the end of the Latin gloss; in many cases, they are complete German half-sentences that paraphrase and continue the end of the Latin gloss. Hellgardt comes to the impression of a pre-form of a German-Latin mixed language, as it occurs as a clerical sociolect in Notker the German or Williram.

== History ==
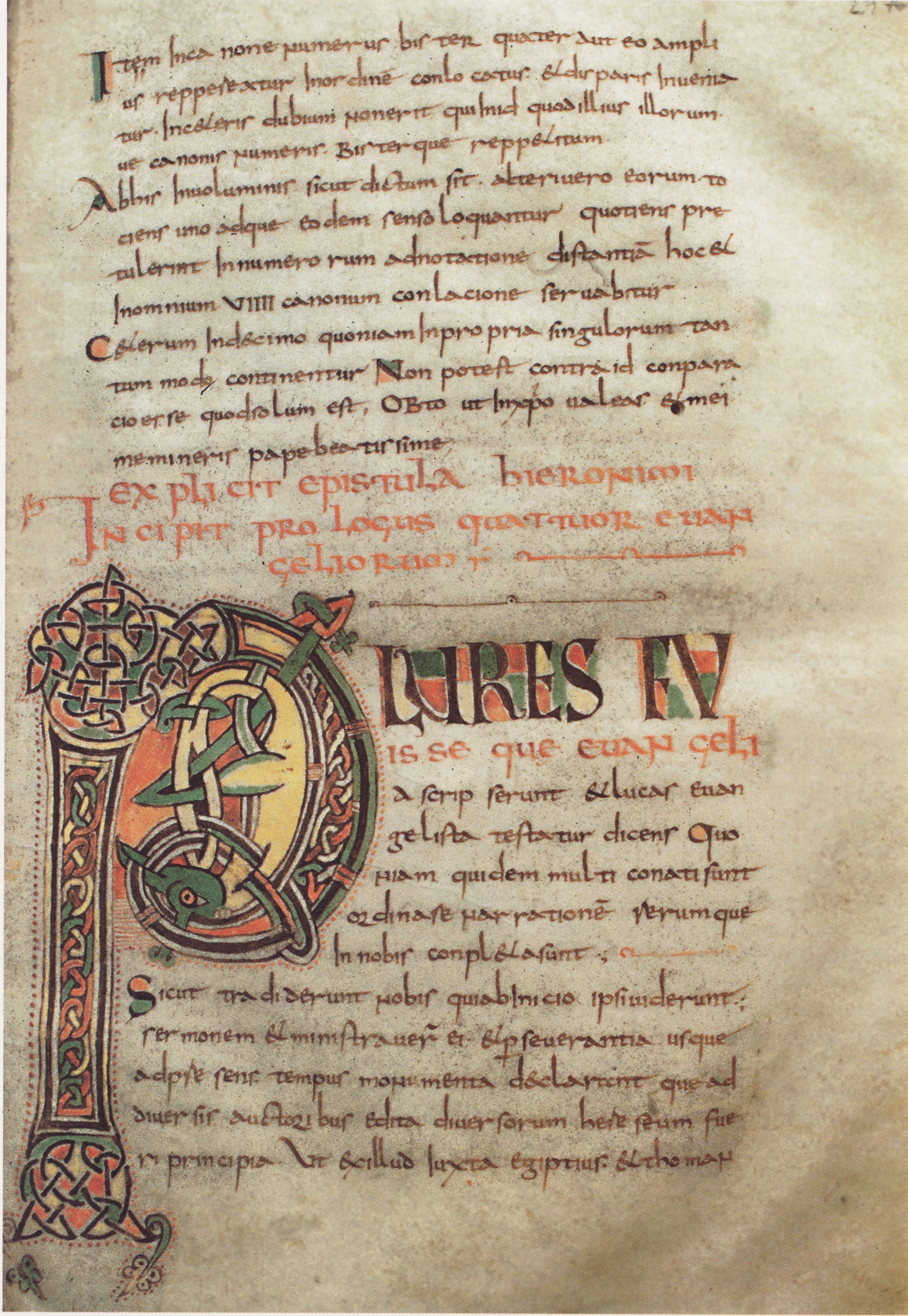
Sheet 16r: Page with the magnificent initial P formed from braided ribbon and two different markup fonts. The text is the beginning of the Jerome preface Plures fuisse.

According to the art-historical classification, the Gospel Book was written around 800, but where is uncertain. The scriptorium in which the manuscript was created has not yet been identified. Based on the typeface and the coincidence of continental and insular influences in the book decoration, the place of origin is assumed to be in northwestern Germany or northeastern France. It is also unknown how and when the manuscript came to Essen. Due to the localization of the manuscript in areas where St. Altfrid, the later founder of Essen Abbey, was trained, the high quality of the manuscript both textually and artistically, and the fact that an Evangeliary was part of the basic liturgical equipment of a church, it is assumed that the Carolingian Gospel of Altfrid himself was left to its foundation. Katrinette Bodarwé pointed out, however, that the manuscript does not contain an entry in the manuscript of the 10th century. "A", which was active in Essen, may not have come to Essen as a founding gift after all.

A letter at the top of fol. 143r entry "Iuntram prb" ("Guntram presbiter") could have come from a former owner. The synopsis "PLENARIVM" on fol. 2r the so-called librarian's hand "B" was registered in Essen around 1200, perhaps not until the first half of the 13th century. Before that, there is no direct proof of ownership of the manuscript.

The glosses of the Gospel Book have characteristic features in the typeface that are typical of the scriptorium of the Essen convent. The scribe also contributed to the sacramentary Main State Archive Düsseldorf Essen D2, which was created in Essen in the last third of the 10th century, so the presence of the manuscript Hs. 1 in Essen is certain as early as the late 10th century. It was around this period that the Gospel Book was rebound for the first time, Georg Humann discovered in 1904 that the penultimate layer was incorrectly sorted and that a narrow strip of parchment with notes in the handwriting of the glosses had been included as sheet 60.

It is possible that the Gospel Book was no longer in use as a liturgical book as early as 946 when the collegiate church of Essen burned down but already served as a schoolbook for the instruction of the sanctimonialus. While all current liturgical writings had to be recreated by the Essen scriptorium after the abbey fire, some books such as the Gospel Book (if it did not come to Essen after the fire) or the sacramental manuscript Hauptstaatsarchiv Düsseldorf D1, which was no longer in liturgical use, were preserved. The reason for this was presumably that they were kept separately from the manuscripts in use. The use as a schoolbook is also evidenced by the pen tests that were made in particularly large numbers on the end paper, where there are lines and hatchings as well as the beginnings of verses such as "Scribere qui nescit, nullum putat esse laborem." ("If you don't know writing, you don't believe it's work") and individual words like "Proba" ("test"). It is discussed that the Gospel Book was also in liturgical use in addition to this use. The Theophanu Gospel Book (Essen Cathedral Treasury Hs. 3), which Abbess Theophanu presumably donated around 1040 for the magnificent staging of the Easter liturgy, has almost identical dimensions to the Carolingian Gospels. Gass therefore assumes that the Theophanu Gospel has replaced the Carolingian Gospel as the pompous Gospel in the monastery liturgy.

Towards the end of the 11th century, the women's convent's interest in its codex holdings dwindled, from which the canons of the monastery put together their library for educational purposes. In this context, the ownership entry of the librarian hand "B" was created. By being included in the canonical library, the manuscript was preserved, while other Essen books were processed into parchment waste. In the library, which was only accessible to a maximum of twenty canons, the Gospel Book fell out of documented use. None of the Essen treasure lists of the early modern period records the manuscript. When Essen Abbey was dissolved in 1802 and valuable manuscripts were brought to Düsseldorf by the new Prussian lords, the Carolingian Gospel remained in Essen for unknown reasons, possibly the manuscript was not found.

The Gospel Book was discovered in the parish archive of the cathedral in 1880. The following year, Georg Humann published a first essay with text excerpts, drawings and a coloured photographic illustration of the cross with the evangelist symbols (fol. 29v). Particular attention was paid to the glosses, and the artistic value of the drawings was measured by the taste of the time, even if they were recognized as characteristic examples of pre-Carolingian book illumination.

In August 1942, the Gospel Book, which had been kept in the Minster Library, was evacuated to the Cistercian monastery in Marienstatt in the Westerwald and thus escaped the bombing raid in which the Minster Library was destroyed on 5 March 1943. In 1949, the manuscript was brought back to Essen. After the cathedral treasury was opened to the public in 1958, the Gospel Book was housed in the manuscript room of the treasury. Since this is the former sectarium of the monastery, the manuscript is in its historical place. After the reopening of the cathedral treasury on 15 May 2009, the manuscript is no longer part of the permanent exhibition for conservation reasons.

== Restoration ==
The manuscript has been restored several times. After being damaged during its evacuation during the Second World War, the parish of St. Johann Baptist, which owned the manuscript after the abolition of the monastery, commissioned the restorer Johannes Sievers at the Main State Archive in Düsseldorf to restore it in 1956-57. He took the manuscript apart and stapled it into a new, "Partly incorrectly". Sievers covered the illuminated pages, which appeared to be particularly in need of protection, with PVC-based Mipo by the state of the art at the time. 96 pages were affected by this measure.

The restoration led to considerable deterioration of the manuscript’s condition. The foil sealed the parchment airtight. Due to the lack of access to humidity, the parchment began to keratinize. Additionally, the high-gloss foil distorted the rather matt colours of the book illumination. Over time, the foil became brown and brittle. For a long time, it was considered impossible to remove the damaging foil without destroying the manuscript. Experiments conducted on other manuscripts that had been similarly pasted showed that the pasty layers of paint of the painting adhered more strongly to the foil than to the parchment and would have been peeled off like decals. In some cases, the foils were successfully removed, but the residues of the adhesive layer led to the pages sticking together to form a massive book block.

In 1985, the Essen Cathedral Treasury founded an expert in Otto Wächter, the head of the Institute for Restoration at the Austrian National Library, who considered it possible to replace the foils. The manuscript was therefore brought to Vienna in January 1986, where Wächter dismantled it. Wächter then placed the individual parchment leaves in a bath of four parts ethanol and one part acetic acid amyl ester to which he added a part of butyl acetate if the solution effect was not sufficient. After a bath of 20 to 30 minutes, Wächter was able to carefully peel off the foils. He then let the parchment dry, which revealed residues of the adhesive layer. Wächter removed this by dabbing, and carefully rotating it with a cotton cloth dipped in acetic acid amyl ester until no sticky residues were perceptible. This step sometimes took several days for one side, as the adhesive residues were only visible when dry. The second restoration problem was verdigris, which was caused by the copper green used in book illumination. Verdigris corrosion occurs in book illumination when the individual paint particles are enclosed by only a small amount of binding agents of the paint. It was also known from the restoration of acidic papers that paper containing magnesium compounds was not affected by verdigris. Wächter therefore coated all parts of the manuscript where verdigris had been used as a dye from both sides of the parchment leaf with a magnesium bicarbonate solution, which he allowed to dry. He then brushed a solution of 20 grams of methylcellulose on one litre of water. In doing so, he took advantage of the ability to settle between dirt particles and fabric, which is also exploited when cellulose is used in detergents. In this way, Wächter stored the copper green particles in a buffer of magnesium salts. He then closed the places where the copper green had already eaten its way through the parchment with goldbeater's skin. The restoration was made more difficult by the fact that the parchment leaves of the manuscript were not allowed to be pressed or stretched, as this could have led to damage to the stylus glosses scratched into the parchment. After completion of the restoration, the manuscript, which had a wooden cover of unknown age, which was certainly not original, was rebounded according to the model of surviving Carolingian book bindings, whereby the binding of an original Salzburg manuscript existing in the Vienna National Library served as a model for the stamp embossing of the binding.

== Bibliography ==
- Bodarwe, Katrinette (2004). Sanctimoniales litteratae. Schriftlichkeit und Bildung in den ottonischen Frauenkommunitäten Gandersheim, Essen und Quedlinburg [Sanctimoniales litteratae: Literacy and Education in the Ottonian Women's Communities of Gandersheim, Essen, and Quedlinburg]. Quellen und Studien / Institut für Kirchengeschichtliche Forschung des Bistums Essen (in German). Vol. 10. Münster: Aschendorff’sche Verlagsbuchhandlung. ISBN 3402062496.
- Bergmann, Rolf; Stricker, Stefanie (2005). Katalog der althochdeutschen und altsächsischen Glossenhandschriften [Catalog of Old High German and Old Saxon Gloss Manuscripts] (in German). Vol. 1: Part A. List of Manuscripts, Part B. Introduction, Part C. Catalog Nos. 1–200. Berlin: de Gruyter. ISBN 3110182726.
- Gerds, Isabel (1999). Das karolingische Evangeliar Hs. 1 des Essener Domschatzes.Eine Studie zur Ornamentik [The Carolingian Gospel Book Hs. 1 of the Essen Cathedral Treasury. A study of ornamentation.] (in German). Kiel: Christian-Albrechts-Universität.
- Hellgardt, Ernst (1998). "Lingua Germanica. Studien zur deutschen Philologie. Jochen Splett zum 60. Geburtstag.". In Schmitsdorf, Eva; Hartl, Nina; Meurer, Barbara (eds.). Philologische Fingerübungen. Bemerkungen zum Erscheinungsbild und zur Funktion der lateinischen und altsächsischen Glossen des Essener Evangeliars (Matthäus-Evangelium) [Philological Exercises: Notes on the Appearance and Function of Latin and Old Saxon Glosses in the Essen Gospel Book (Matthew Gospel)] (in German). Münster: Waxmann. pp. 32–69. ISBN 3-89325-632-6.
- Humann, Georg (1904). Die Kunstwerke der Münsterkirche zu Essen [The Artworks of the Essen Minster Church] (in German). Düsseldorf: Schwann. pp. 37–81.
- Karpp, Gerhard (2000). "Herrschaft, Bildung und Gebet. Gründung und Anfänge des Frauenstifts Essen.". In Berghaus, Günter; Schilp, Thomas; Schlagheck, Michael (eds.). Die Anfänge einer Büchersammlung im Frauenstift Essen. Ein Blick auf die importierten Handschriften des neunten Jahrhunderts [The Beginnings of a Book Collection in the Essen Women's Foundation: A Look at the Imported Manuscripts of the Ninth Century] (in German). Essen: Klartext-Verlag. pp. 119–133. ISBN 3884749072.
- Köbler, Gerhard (1987). Sammlung aller Glossen des Altsächsischen [Collection of All Old Saxon Glosses]. Arbeiten zur Rechts- und Sprachwissenschaft (in German). Vol. 32. Gießen: Arbeiten zur Rechts- und Sprachwissenschaft Verlags-GmbH. pp. 95–109. ISBN 3884300539.
- Pothmann, Alfred (1991). Das Karolingische Evangeliar. Bericht von der Restaurierung der frühmittelalterlichen Handschrift [The Carolingian Gospel Book: Facsimile of Manuscript Hs. 1 from the Essen Cathedral Treasury] (in German). Stuttgart: Verlag Müller und Schindler.
- Pothmann, Alfred (1987). "The Carolingian Gospel Book: Report on the Restoration of the Early Medieval Manuscript". Münster am Hellweg: Mitteilungsblatt des Vereins für die Erhaltung des Essener Münsters (in German). 40: 13–15.
- Tewes, Babette (2014). "Karl der Große – Charlemagne. Karls Kunst. Katalog der Sonderausstellung Karls Kunst vom 20. Juni bis 21. September 2014 im Centre Charlemagne, Aachen.". In van den Brink, Peter; Ayooghi, Sarvenaz (eds.). Essener Evangeliar [Essen Gospel Book] (in German). Dresden: Sandstein. pp. 246–249. ISBN 978-3-95498-093-2.
