= St. Johann Baptist, Essen =

Parish church in Essen, Germany

Coordinates: 51°27′21″N 7°00′47″E

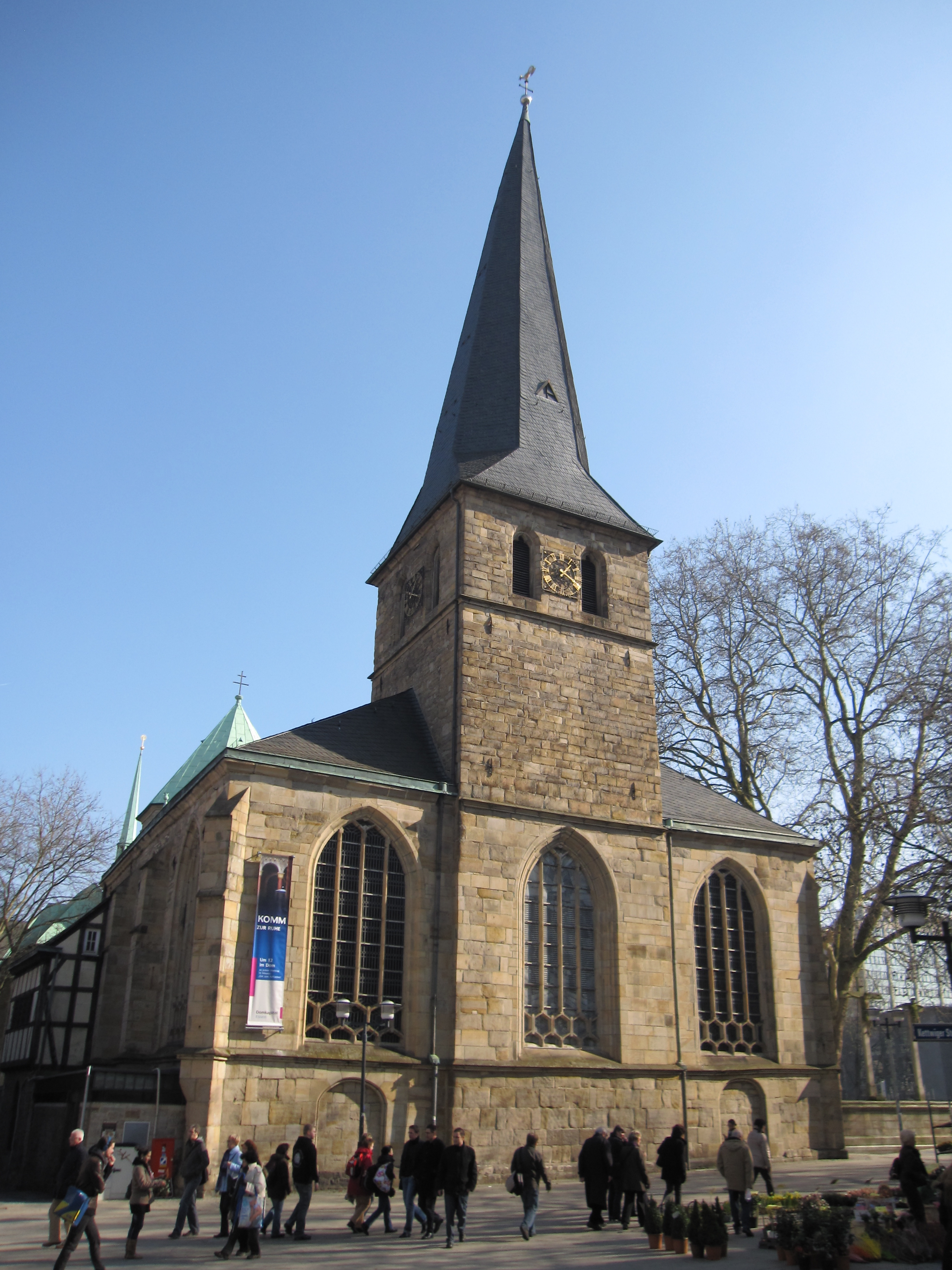
St. Johann Baptist in Essen

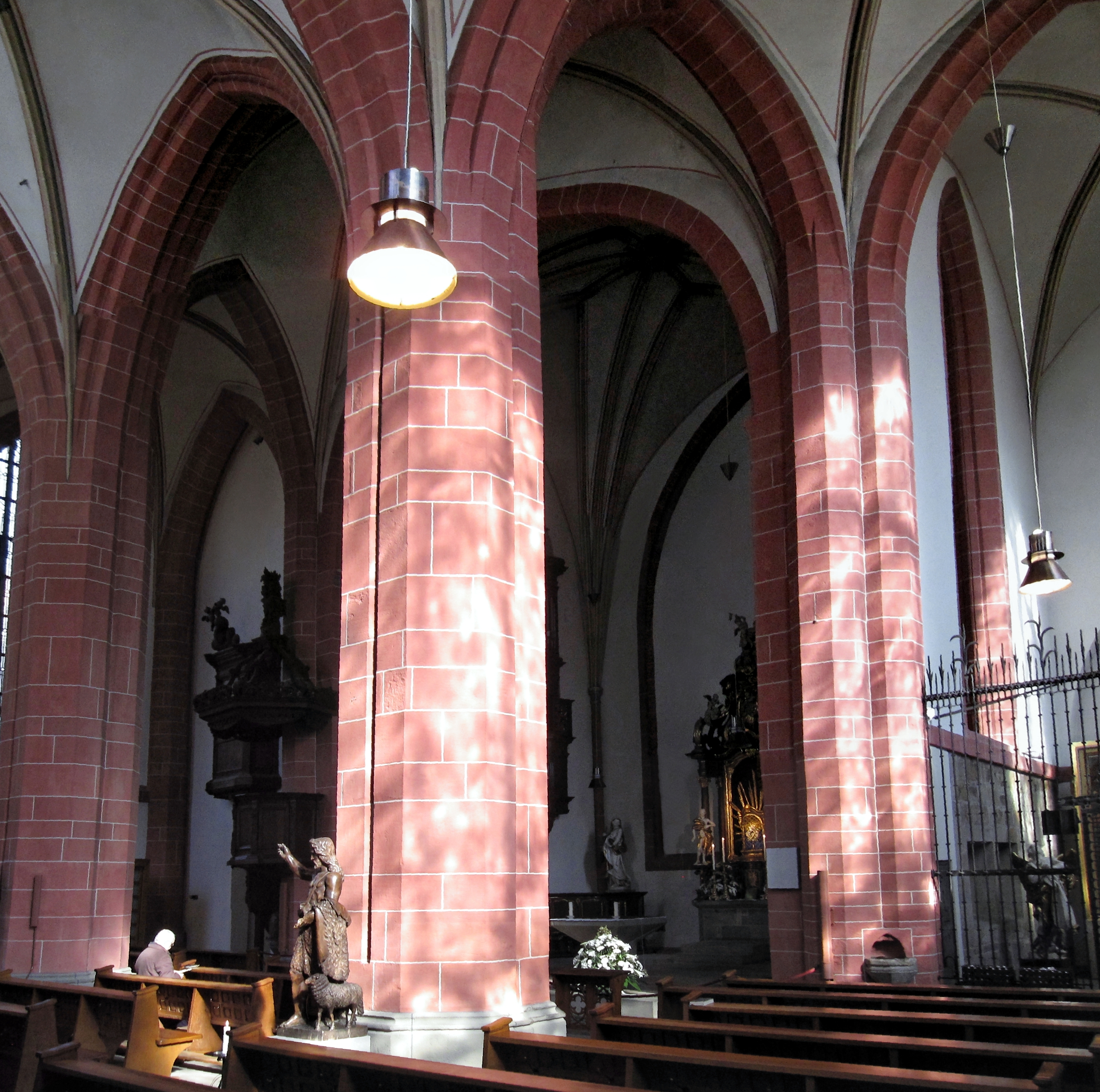
Interior

The Catholic parish church of St. Johann Baptist is a Gothic hall church in Essen, dedicated to John the Baptist, which stands on Kettwiger Straße, the main street of Essen, in front of Essen Minster, to which it is connected. On account of its position and the fact that its spire towers over the Minster, visitors often mistake it for part of the Minster.

== History and architecture ==
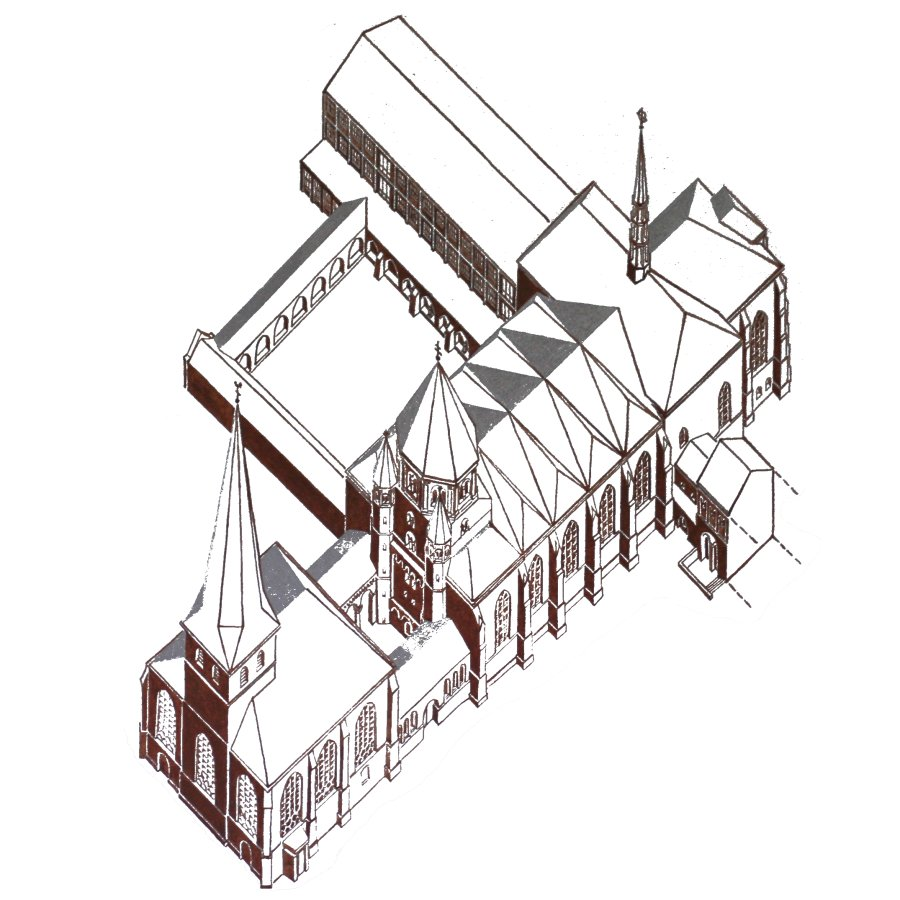
The Essen Minster complex, with St. Johann Baptist in the foreground

The church is descended from a chapel of St John the Baptist, which already belonged to Essen Abbey in the tenth century. According to the will of Theophanu, Abbess of Essen , who died in 1058, candles were to be burnt in her memory ad sanctum Iohannem, which appears to be the first mention of the church. The dedication of the church to John the Baptist suggests that it was originally a baptistry. The foundations of this original chapel were identified in archaeological excavations after the Second World War. In 1264, the Abbess Berta von Arnsberg promoted the chapel to the rank of a filial parish church of the Abbey. Subsequently, the church served as a meeting place for the canons who carried out those sacred rites which could only be performed by men for the women of the Abbey. The church was rebuilt in 1471 as a Gothic hall church, and a rectangular east choir was added. From 1699 until 1768, baroque furnishings were added. These included choir stalls, side altars and a pulpit. The pulpit was replaced by one in the rococo style in 1769. The church was renovated and repainted in 1968.

The almost square groundplan of the building is divided into nine sections. The three aisled late Gothic nave has a square choir at one end, flanked by a southern side choir and a northern passageway containing the organ loft. The three bays of the west end of the nave are of equal size. A trapezoidal crossing space permits a wider choir bay at the east end. The central bay at the west end supports the tower, which is not visible from inside the church, since the mass of the enormous, high-spired tower is distributed onto the pillars without variation in the height of the roof vaults.

Today, the church serves as a place of worship and parish church for the Catholic community in Essen's inner city.

== High altar of Barthel Bruyn the Elder ==
The baroque high altar of the church is of art historical significance. It was originally a side altar of Essen Abbey and features four altar tables made by Barthel Bruyn the Elder between 1522 and 1525 for the high altar of Essen Abbey. The paintings are masterpieces of the highest quality. They depict the life of Jesus. The tables are painted on both sides, with the crucifixion on the reverse of the nativity and the Descent from the Cross on the reverse of the Adoration of the Magi. Only two images are visible at a time. The descent from the cross is especially remarkable for the depiction of a Central European city in the background instead of Jerusalem. This city is the oldest image of the city of Essen.

=== Images of the altar ===
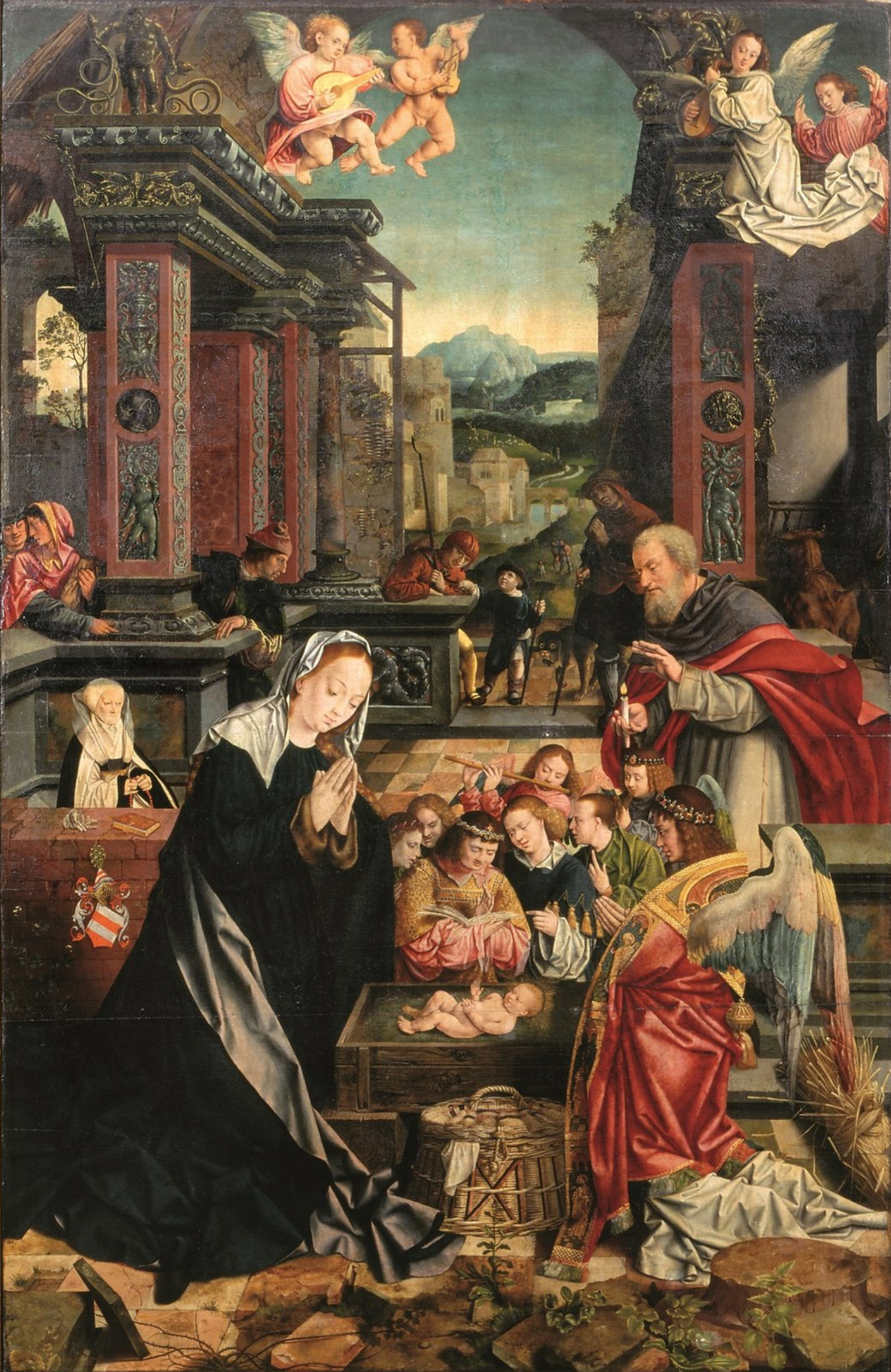
Nativity

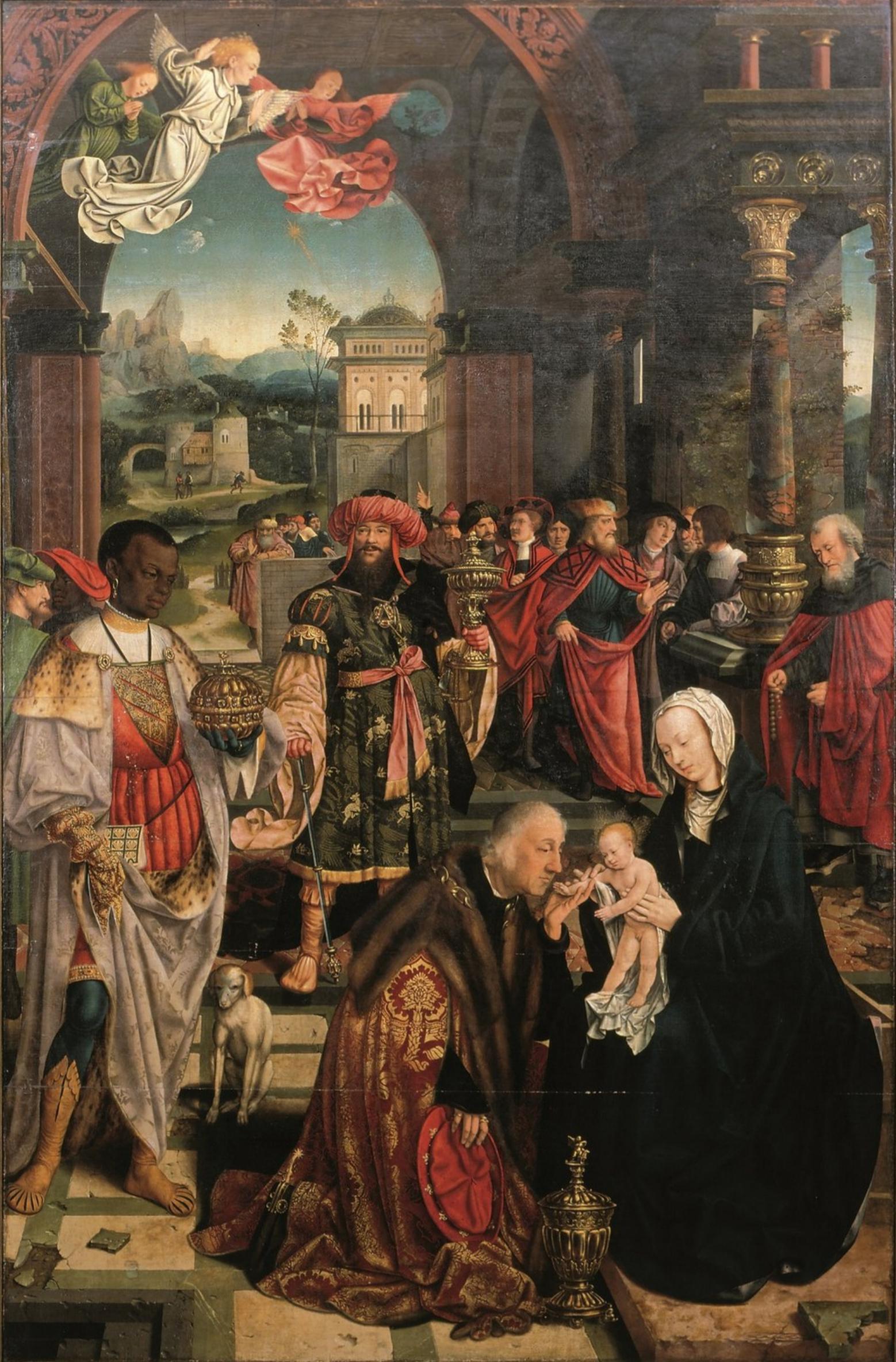
Adoration of the Magi

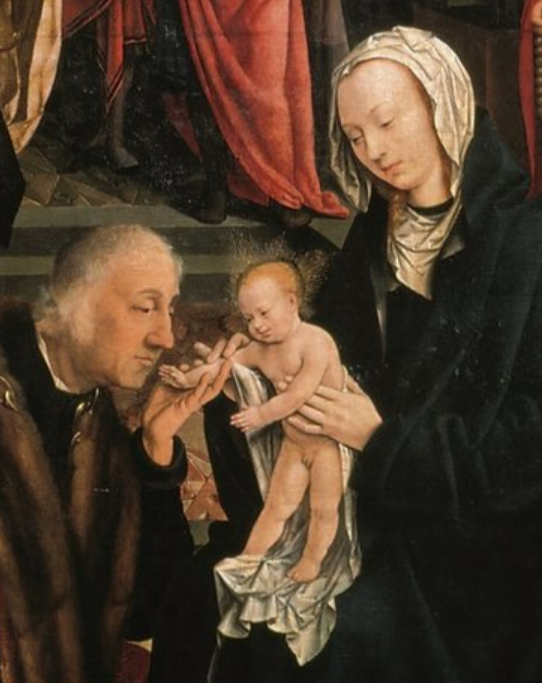
Detail of the Adoration of the Magi

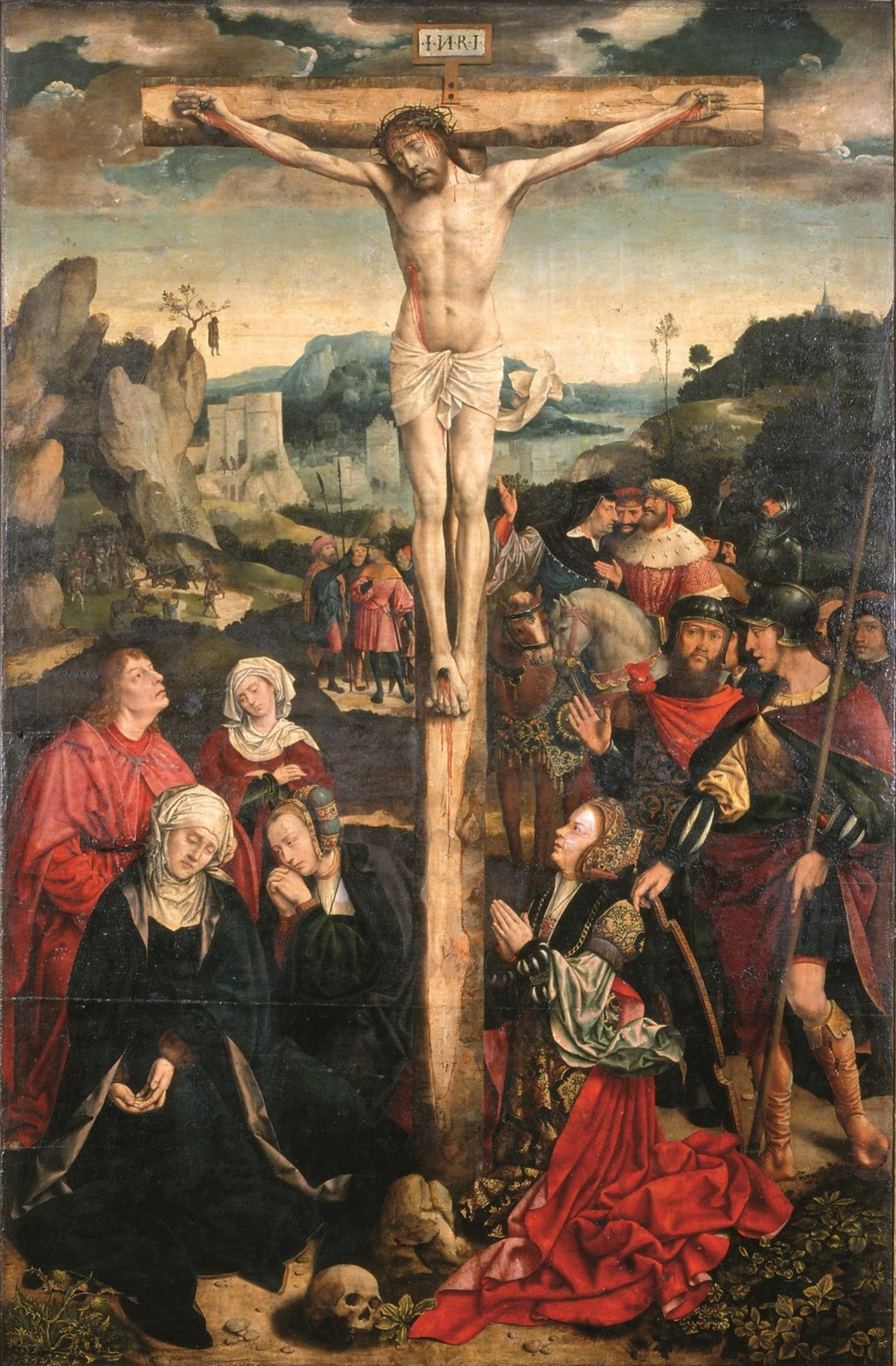
Crucifixion

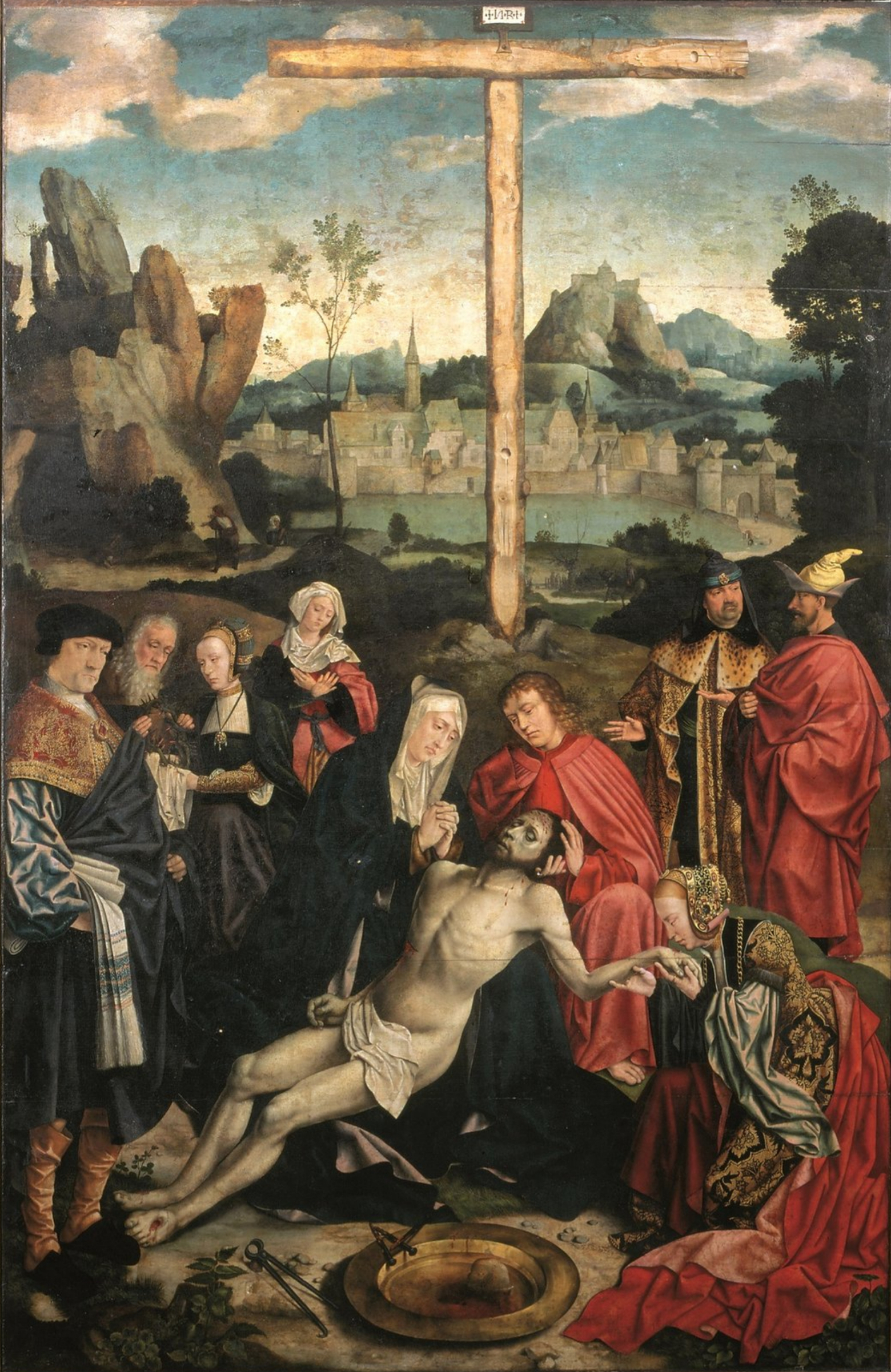
Descent from the Cross

== Bells ==
The church has three bells, made in 1787, that were saved from the donation of bells to the war effort in 1917 due to their significance. In 1940, the bells were seized for the war effort, but they were not melted down. All three bells bear the inscription, Henricus et Everhardus Petit me fuderunt anno 1787 (Henry and Everhard Petit made me in the year 1787), which indicates that they are the work of the Petit & Gebr. Edelbrock bell foundry, which still operates in Gescher to this day. The es^{2} bell has no other inscription, the as^{1} bell also reads St. Johannes Baptista and the c^{2} bell is inscribed St. Johannes Evangelista. From Abbey records is known that these bells cost a total of 1687 Reichsthaler 7 Stüber, of which 1173 Thaler 24 Stüber were paid in cash. The founders took the old bells in payment for the remainder. All the bells supplement the Minster's peal and are rung together.

== Bibliography ==
- Paul Clemen:Die Kunstdenkmäler der Stadt und des Kreises Essen (= Die Kunstdenkmäler der Rheinprovinz Vol. 2, 3). Schwann, Düsseldorf 1893, pp. 55–56 (Digitised).
