= Beatrix von Holte =

German abbess (1250–1327)

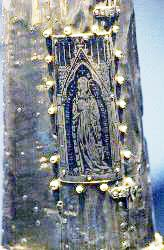
Beatrix von Holte (reliquary, 1310s)

Beatrix von Holte (1250 – 4 December 1327 in Essen) was the Abbess of Essen Abbey from 1292 until her death.
