= Ida (abbess of St. Maria im Kapitol) =

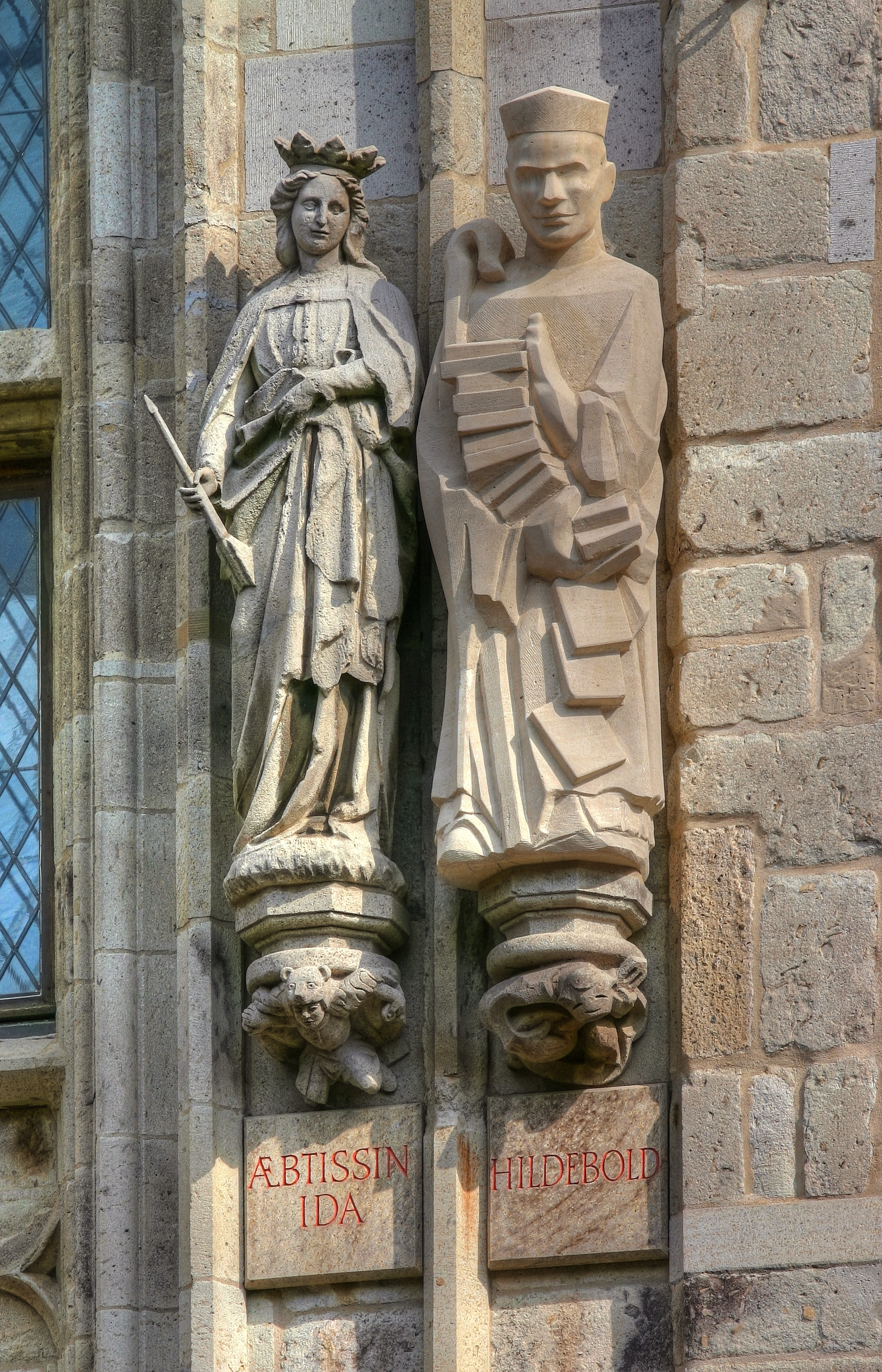
Tower of the City hall in Cologne - Ida and Hildebold

Ida (born before 1025, died 7 or 8 April 1060) was abbess of the convent St. Maria im Kapitol (St. Mary's in the Capitol) in Cologne. She belonged to the family of the Ezzonids, who became prominent in Lower Lorraine in the 11th century.

== Biography ==
Ida was the daughter of Mathilde, a sister of King and Emperor Otto III and Ezzo, Count Palatine of Lotharingia. Because of his marriage into the royal family and his considerable wealth, Ezzo and his offspring became prominent in the 11th century; his dynasty is called the Ezzonids. Ezzo and Mathilde had ten children, all of whom held important positions in Lower Lorraine. Ida was one of the younger children. Her exact birthdate is uncertain, but was certainly before 1025, when her mother Mathilde died. Her father Ezzo died in 1034.

Ida and her sister Sophia were most likely educated in Gandersheim Abbey. They left Gandersheim in 1026 and entered the convent of St. Maria Altenmünster in Mainz. Only one year later, in 1027, they had to return to Gandersheim, because of an ongoing conflict between the Archbishop of Mainz and the Bishop of Hildesheim (Gandersheim Conflict). In 1028, they were able to go back to Mainz. However, Ida returned to Gandersheim for good in 1031, when Aribo, the Archbishop of Mainz, died. Her sister Sophia had already died in Mainz.

No later than 1038, Ida became abbess of St. Maria of Gandersheim, which was part of Gandersheim Abbey. She got her sanctification from Bishop Godehard of Hildesheim, who died on 5 May 1038. At the latest in 1049 (and probably before 1039), Ida became abbess of St. Maria im Kapitol in Cologne. As her brother Herman II was Archbishop of Cologne from 1036 to 1056, it is likely that he helped her to gain the position. On 5 July 1049, she was certainly present at the altar dedication in the church St. Maria in Kapitol, executed by Pope Leo IX. Emperor Heinrich III was also there during the dedication, which highlights the significance of the church and its abbess. Ida died on 7 or 8 April 1060 and was buried in the church of St. Maria im Kapitol. There, her sarcophagus can still be visited today.

== Legacy ==
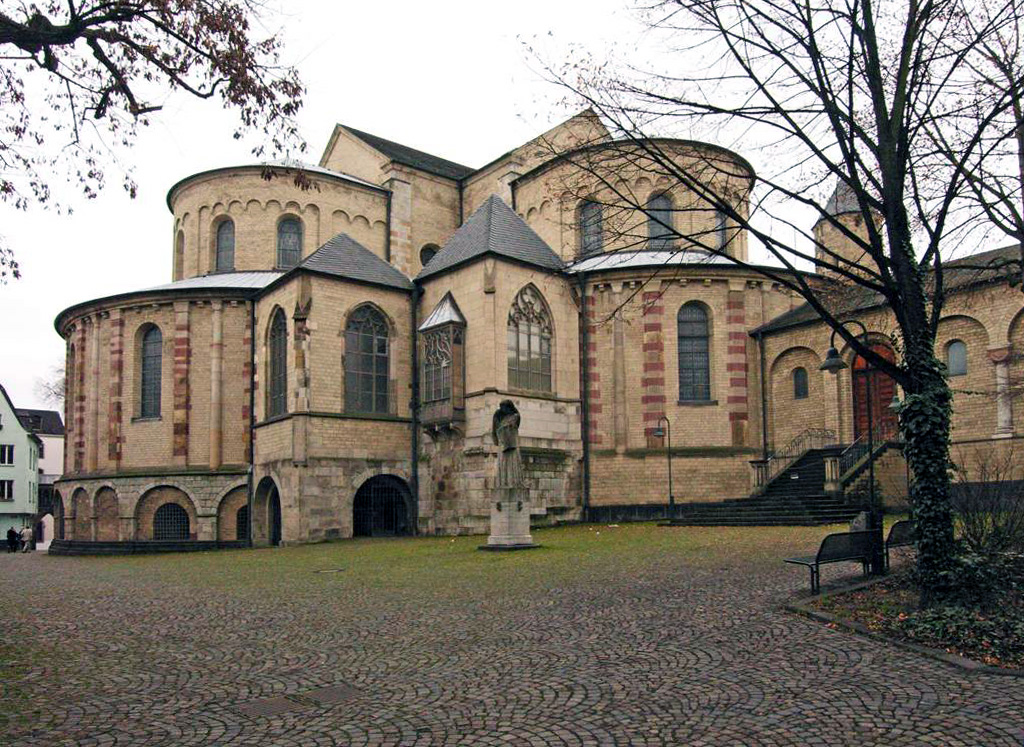
St. Maria im Kapitol

The church of the convent St. Maria im Kapitol was newly built around 1040/45. It is regarded as one of the most important constructions of the 11th century in the Holy Roman Empire. The new building is mainly attributed to Ida. Some scholars also point to a very likely participation of her brother, Archbishop Herman II. The church probably contained several furnishings, of which two artefacts are still preserved today: the wooden doors and the Herimann-Kreuz (crucifix). The wooden doors are seen as one of the most important pieces of woodcarving of the High Middle Ages. As demonstrated by dendrochronology, they were built around 1044, during Ida's time as Abbess, and thus are regarded as her legacy. The Herimann-Kreuz (crucifix) is mostly seen as a joint endowment of the siblings Herman II and Ida. Both are depicted with their names on its backside. The Crucifix is a remarkable artefact, as the head of Christ is replaced by a woman's head. Today, it can be seen in the Diözesanmuseum of Cologne.

Different scholars believe that Ida is responsible for the production of the Hidda-Codex of Gerresheim and the Hidta-Codex of Meschede. The Hidda-Codex is presumed to be the oldest preserved illuminated manuscript from the High Middle Ages in Cologne. However, the determination of their age and their donor are part of an ongoing scientific discussion. Ida might also have given a column with a crucifix for the collegiate church in Essen, where her sister Theopanu was abbess. The crucifix is not preserved, but, there still exist two metal plates, which state an abbess named Ida as donor.

Ida is represented in one of the statues on the first floor of the tower of the City hall in Cologne. These figures represent notable persons of the city.

== Bibliography ==
- Berges, Wilhelm. Godehard, in: Neue Deutsche Biographie (NDB). volume 6, Duncker & Humblot, Berlin 1964, p. 495–497.
- Beuckers, Klaus Gereon. Die Ezzonen und ihre Stiftungen: eine Untersuchung der Stiftungstätigkeit im 11. Jahrhundert, Münster, Hamburg 1993.
- Beuckers, Klaus Gereon. Rex iubet Christus imperat. Studien zu den Holztüren von St. Maria im Kapitol und zu Herodesdarstellungen vor dem Investiturstreit, Köln 1999.
- Knapp, Ulrich. "Der salische Neubau von St. Maria im Kapitol zu Köln. Eine kritische Revision, in: Förderverein Romanische Kirchen Köln e.V." (Ed.), Colonia Romanica. Jahrbuch des Fördervereins Romanische Kirchen Köln e.V., Köln 2009.
- Riemer, Dieter. "Neue Überlegungen zu Hitda, in: Klaus Gereon Beuckers" (Ed.), Äbtissin Hitda und der Hitda-Codex. Forschungen zu einem Hauptwerk der ottonischen Kölner Buchmalerei, Darmstadt 2013.
- Surmann, Ulrike. Das Kreuz Herimanns und Idas, Köln 1999.
- Uhlirz, Mathilde. Ezzo (Erenfrid), in: Neue Deutsche Biographie, volume 4, Duncker & Humblot, Berlin 1959, p. 715-716.
- Weilandt, Gerhard. "Der Hitda-Codex und seine Stifterin Ida von St. Maria im Kapitol. Eine Wiederbegegnung nach einem Vierteljahrhundert, in: Klaus Gereon Beuckers" (Ed.), Äbtissin Hitda und der Hitda-Codex. Forschungen zu einem Hauptwerk der ottonischen Kölner Buchmalerei, Darmstadt 2013.
- Wisplinghoff, Erich. Hermann II., in: Neue Deutsche Biographie (NDB). volume 8, Duncker & Humblot, Berlin 1969, p. 635.
