= 100th =

100th is the ordinal form of the number 100. 100th, One-hundredth, or Hundredth may also refer to:

== Common uses ==
- Hundredth, a fraction, 1/100, equal to one of 100 equal parts
- 100th anniversary, also known as a centennial or centenary

== Places ==
- 100th meridian east, a line of longitude
- 100th meridian west, a line of longitude
- 100th Street (disambiguation)

== Military ==
- 100th Army Band
- 100th Brigade (disambiguation)
- 100th Division (disambiguation)
- 100th Regiment (disambiguation)
- 100th Squadron (disambiguation)

== Other uses ==
- 100th century
- 100th century BC
- April 10, 100th day of the year in a standard year
- "The 100th", a season 5 episode of The Middle
- Hundredth (band), an American rock band

== See also ==
- 100 (disambiguation)
- Hundred (disambiguation)
