= Reuben Mussey =

Reuben Mussey may refer to:

- Reuben D. Mussey, American medical doctor
- Reuben D. Mussey Jr., American lawyer, son of the above
