= Stephen Wermiel =

American legal scholar and professor

Stephen J. Wermiel
- Occupation: Professor
- Spouse: Rhonda Schwartz

Academic background
- Education: Tufts University (BA); American University (JD)

Academic work
- Discipline: Constitutional law
- Institutions: Georgia State University; American University
- Main interests: constitutional law; First Amendment; United States Supreme Court; law and government

Stephen J. Wermiel is an American legal scholar, historian, and professor of law at American University Washington College of Law specializing in First Amendment law and the history of the United States Supreme Court. Wermiel has written several biographical books about Supreme Court Justice William J. Brennan, Jr. Alongside Jamie Raskin, Wermiel co-founded the Marshall-Brennan Constitutional Literacy Project.

== Early life and education ==
Wermiel was born at the American Hospital of Paris in Neuilly-sur-Seine, France. His family moved to Brooklyn when he was two years old. Wermiel attended Brooklyn Friends School, where he wrote about the Supreme Court for the student newspaper, The Life. He graduated in 1968.

Wermiel attended Tufts University, receiving his Bachelor of Arts in 1972. While at Tufts, Wermiel worked as the editor of the student newspaper. In 1982, Wermiel received his Juris Doctor from American University Washington College of Law.

== Career ==
=== Journalism ===
Wermiel began as a college intern and later became a correspondent for the Boston Globe for the Washington, D.C. area. From 1979 to 1991, Wermiel covered the U.S. Supreme Court for the Wall Street Journal, remaining there even after his law school graduation. In the 1990s, Wermiel also served on the board of directors and legal committee of the ACLU of Georgia.

In 1986, Justice Brennan secretly agreed to work with Wermiel on a biography after Judge Abner Mikva recommended Wermiel. Justice Brennan gave Wermiel more than sixty hours of recorded interviews in chambers and allowed him access to tens of thousands of pages of records. The records included case files, correspondence, and case histories that Justice Brennan's clerks had prepared each term. Wermiel was the only person allowed to see the case histories. Wermiel began working on the book, which he intended to publish after Justice Brennan's retirement. Justice Brennan retired in 1990, but after his death in 1997, Wermiel stopped working. At the time, he was approximately twenty-five percent done with the book. In 2004, Jeffrey Toobin and Justice Brennan's son, William J. Brennan III, criticized Wermiel for his failure to use his unparalleled access to Justice Brennan's documents that was unavailable to other researchers. Wermiel responded by saying that he was overwhelmed by the project. In 2006, Wermiel asked Seth Stern to work on the book with him. Stern who reorganized the material and drafted most of the book chapters. In 2010, Stern and Wermiel published the book as Justice Brennan: Liberal Champion.

Wermiel is a contributor to SCOTUSblog, where he writes the SCOTUS for Law Students column. Wermiel has made numerous appearances on cable news networks, including ABC News and MSNBC. Wermiel has also made appearances on C-SPAN as a correspondent and legal expert.

=== American University Washington College of Law ===
Wermiel was a teaching fellow at William and Mary Law School and then taught at Georgia State University College of Law. Eventually, Wermiel accepted a professorship at American University Washington College of Law, his alma mater.

Wermiel and Representative Jamie Raskin, who was also a professor at the Washington College of Law at the time, co-founded the Marshall-Brennan Constitutional Literacy Project in 1999. The project places law students in underserved high schools, where the law students teach constitutional law and civic engagement to high school students. Wermiel previously served as the associate director of the Marshall-Brennan Constitutional Literacy Project. He currently serves as a faculty adviser for the project.

Wermiel is a Fellow in the Program on Law & Government at the university.

Wermiel is a faculty adviser for the Moot Court Honor Society, American University Law Review, Administrative Law Review, and the Journal of Gender, Social Policy & the Law.

== Publications ==
=== Books ===
- Justice Brennan: Liberal Champion (with Seth Stern) (Houghton Mifflin Harcourt 2010).
- Justice Brennan and Federalism Encyclopedia of American Federalism (Joseph Marbach, Ellis Katz, & Troy Smith, eds., Greenwood Press 2005).
- Essay on Justice Brennan Yale Biographical Dictionary of American Law (Yale U. Press 2004).
- William J. Brennan, Jr. Oxford Companion to American Law (Oxford U. Press 2002).
- William J. Brennan, Jr. American National Biography Online (Oxford U. Press 2001) (reprinted in American National Biography (Print Supp.), 2002).
- A Claim of Sexual Harassment A Year in the Life of the Supreme Court (Rodney A. Smolla, ed., Duke U. Press 1995).
- William J. Brennan Jr. The Supreme Court Justices A Biographical Dictionary (Melvin Urofsky, ed., Garland Publishing 1994).
- William J. Brennan Jr. The Supreme Court Justices Illustrated Biographies 1789-1993 (Clare Cushman, ed., Congressional Q. 1993).

== Awards ==
In January 2018, Wermiel received the Robert F. Drinan Award from the American Bar Association Section of Civil Rights and Social Justice for dedication and service to the section.

== Personal life ==
Wermiel is married to Rhonda Schwartz, the senior producer for Brian Ross at ABC News. Together, they have one daughter, Anne. They have a home in Sharon, Connecticut.
