= D100 =

D100 may refer to:

- Nikon D100, A digital camera manufactured by Nikon
- State road D100 (Turkey), a major highway in Turkey
- D100 road, a Croatian state road
- d100, the notation for percentile dice
  - Zocchihedron, a 100-sided playing die
- Dodge D100 a model of Dodge truck from 1961 to 1993
- D100 Radio, a Hong Kong Internet radio station
- D100 Radio New York, an Internet radio station

== See also ==
- 100D (disambiguation)
- 100 (disambiguation)
