= 100th Regiment =

100th Regiment or 100th Infantry Regiment may refer to:

== Union Army (American Civil War) ==
- 100th Illinois Infantry Regiment
- 100th Indiana Infantry Regiment
- 100th New York Infantry Regiment
- 100th Ohio Infantry Regiment
- 100th Pennsylvania Infantry Regiment
- 100th United States Colored Infantry Regiment

== Other uses ==
- 100th Regiment of Foot (disambiguation), several units of the British Army
- 100th Anti-Tank Regiment, Royal Artillery (The Gordon Highlanders)
- 100th (Yeomanry) Regiment Royal Artillery
- 100th Heavy Anti-Aircraft Regiment, Royal Artillery
- 100th Light Anti-Aircraft Regiment, Royal Artillery
- 100th Guards Fighter Aviation Regiment
- 100th Independent Shipborne Fighter Aviation Regiment
- 100th Regiment Winnipeg Grenadiers

== See also ==
- 100th Brigade (disambiguation)
- 100th Division (disambiguation)
