= Aachen Chapel of Hungary =

Side Chapel of Roman Catholic cathedral in Aachen, Germany

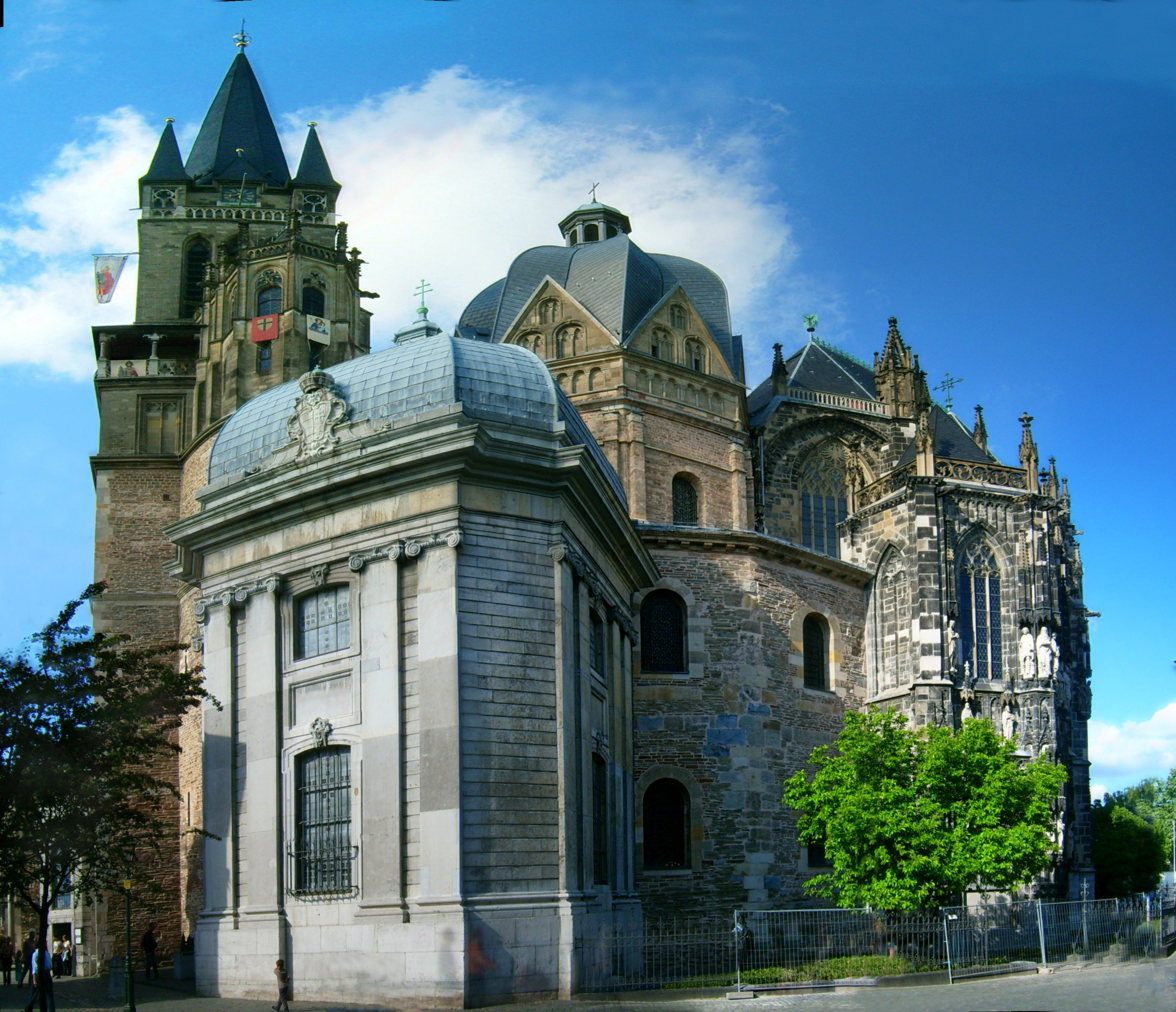

Religion
- Affiliation: Roman Catholic
- Province: Diocese of Aachen

Location
- Location: Aachen, North Rhine-Westphalia, Germany
- Interactive map of Aachen Chapel of Hungary
- Coordinates: 50°46′29.1″N 6°5′2.12″E

Architecture
- Type: chapel

UNESCO World Heritage Site
- Criteria: Cultural: i, ii, iv, vi
- Reference: 3
- Inscription: 1367 (Unknown Session)

Aachen Chapel of Hungary (Hungarian: Aacheni magyar kápolna; German: Aachener Ungarnkapelle; French: Chapelle Hongroise d'Aix-la-Chapelle) is a side chapel of the Aachen Cathedral (German: Aachener Dom), one of the oldest cathedrals in Europe.

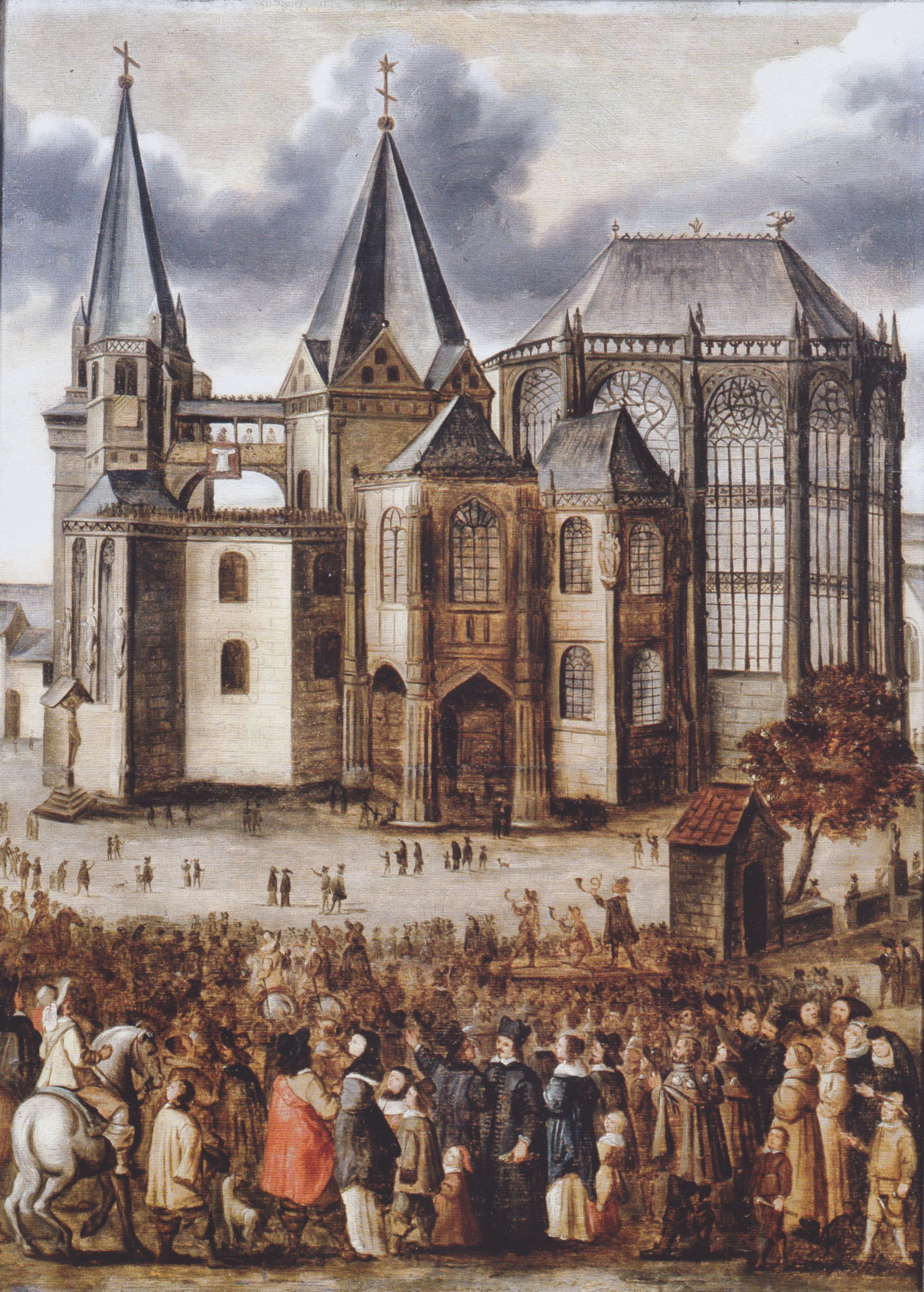
The view of the cathedral with the Gothic Hungarian Chapel during the pilgrimage of 1622

== Aachenfahrt ==
Hungarian pilgrims have shared a bond with Aachen Cathedral and its relics for nearly seven hundreds. Since 1349, every seventh year, the holy relics of Christ's incarnation have drawn throngs of pilgrims — including from Hungary — to the German coronation city of six centuries.

The foundation of the Hungarian Chapel in Aachen was connected to the pilgrimages known as Aachenfahrt or Heiligtumsfahrt, in which Hungarian pilgrims took part in great numbers. Aachen was the third most important pilgrimage site in medieval Europe, next to Rome and Santiago de Compostela. In Germany, the custom of the Aachenfahrt is linked to the veneration of the relics of the Holy Land donated to the Aachen Cathedral by the Frankish Emperor Charlemagne. In Hungary, this tradition, of which we only have certain records from the beginning of the 14th century, was probably introduced by settlers from the Walloon and Rhineland regions. The Aachen Rites soon became attractive to Hungarian believers through the Germans who settled in Hungary.

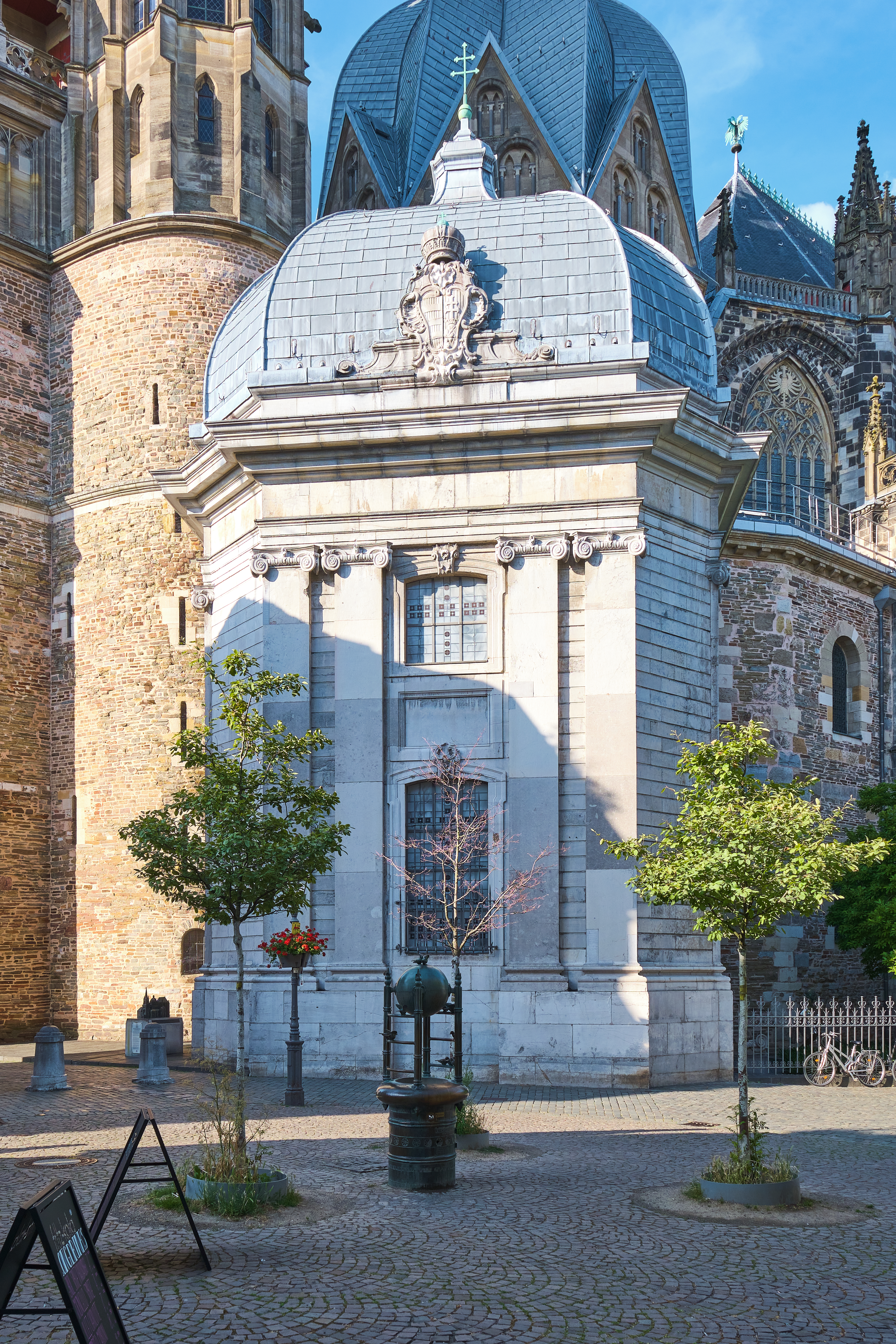
Aachen Chapel of Hungary with the Hungarian coat of arms on top

== Hungarian pilgrims ==
According to contemporary chronicles, despite the distance of over a thousand and two hundred kilometres, Hungarians were always the most numerous of all nations to participate in the Aachen farewell processions, with some years seeing over five thousand Hungarian pilgrims.

The procession of pilgrim groups of hundreds of people - some of them by water, the Danube and the Rhine - lasted several weeks, usually more than a month. They followed the route Vienna - Passau - Regensburg - Nuremberg - Frankfurt - Mainz - Koblenz. On their way to Aachen, the Hungarian pilgrims could also stop in Cologne, where there was a lodging house reserved just for them. Wealthy Hungarians also built beautiful houses around the cathedral, most of which still decorate the old town. In 1804 they were evicted by Emperor Napoleon Bonaparte, whose favorite residence was Aachen.

== Construction of the Chapel of Hungary ==
Louis I of Hungary's mother Elizabeth of Poland, Queen of Hungary, visited the tomb of Elizabeth of Hungary in Marburg and the Shrine of the Three Kings in Cologne during her pilgrimage in 1357. Finally, with her large entourage, she made a pilgrimage to Aachen, where she met Charles IV, Holy Roman Emperor and his wife Anna von Schweidnitz. During her visit, the Dowager Queen made a rich gift to the shrine in Aachen (some of these Hungarian treasures can still be seen in the treasury of the cathedral).

The lessons and experiences of his mother's pilgrimage encouraged Louis I of Hungary to build a chapel in Aachen to match the cathedral. During the pilgrimage of 1364, he made a large donation to build it and to keep two Hungarian priests. The chapel was completed in 1367 in Gothic style. The foundation charter also included ecclesiastical furnishings, vestments, chalices, altarpieces, candlesticks and missal books, which were also provided by the Hungarian king. He also provided for the income of the chapel by purchasing land in the vicinity of Aachen, the proceeds of which were to be used to maintain the Chapel of Hungary and for the needs of the Hungarian chaplains. The legal relations between the Hungarian dynasty and the City of Aachen were regulated by a donation charter in 1370.

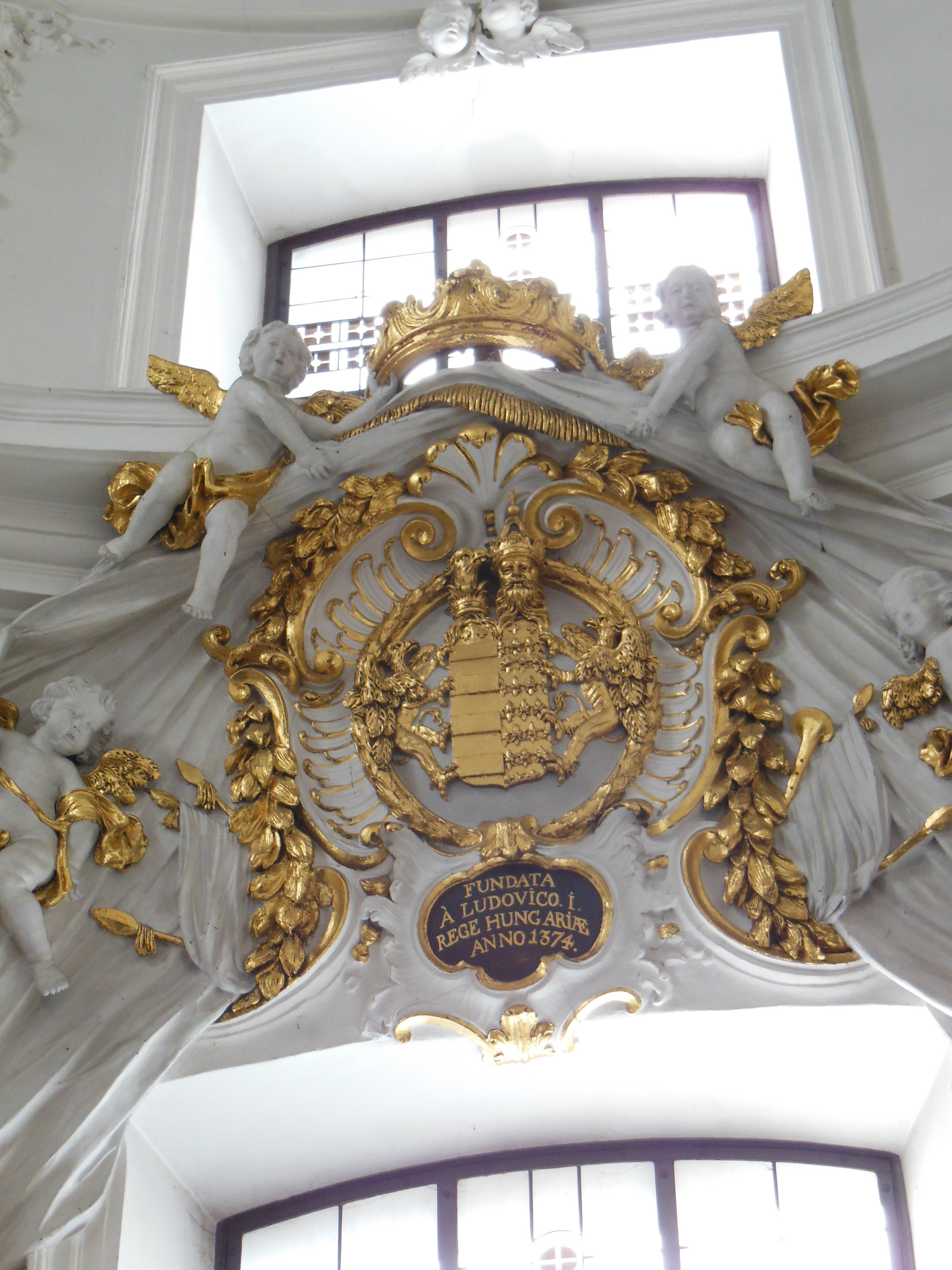
Above the altar of the Chapel of Hungary is the name of Louis I of Hungary (Ludovico I) and the year of his probable visit to Aachen in 1374

The Gothic chapel built on the south side of the cathedral was directly connected to the Carolingian octagon, the octagonal church of Charlemagne. The chapel had altars with the relics of Stephen I of Hungary, Saint Emeric of Hungary and Ladislaus I of Hungary, which must have been built by 1366, because Pope Urban V had already granted privileges to the chaplain of the chapel dedicated to Ladislaus I of Hungary in a bull of his. In 1374, it is assumed that Louis I of Hungary himself visited Aachen to see the chapel, where the relics of the Hungarian saints gave the shrine a slightly Hungarian touch. This also contributed to the fact that the building was soon referred to as the Chapel of Hungary by the locals.

== Reconstruction of the Chapel of Hungary ==
In the early 16th century, with the spread of the Reformation, the structural condition of the chapel deteriorated as donations from Hungarian pilgrimages temporarily dwindled.In 1656, a great fire in Aachen destroyed the roof of the Chapel of Hungary. The treasures kept there were moved to the city hall to protect them from destruction. Afterwards, the chapel was even more neglected and fell into a state of ruin and disrepair.

During the reign of Maria Theresa, the Hungarian lords involved in the War of succession often visited Aachen, where the imperial armies were headquartered. In 1747, General Károly Batthyány, in agreement with the other Hungarian generals, commissioned the municipal architect Johann Couven to renovate the chapel. The Gothic chapel was completely demolished and the foundation stone of the new chapel was laid. However, construction was slow and did not go according to the original plans, and over time the newly built walls sank and collapsed. As a result, the entire building had to be demolished.

The work was then entrusted to the Milanese architect Joseph Moretti in 1756. By 1764, the chapel's roof was finished. The chapel, rebuilt in the Baroque-Classicist style, has a rounded square exterior and a circular interior, with one side facing the cathedral and the other half facing the south staircase. The three windows and the entrance are each surmounted by a large coat of arms with a stylised crown above, with shutters on either side closed by a wide drapery. Underneath, on a black panel, is the inscription 'FUNDATA A LUDOVICO I REGE HUNGARIAE ANNO 1374' (FUNDED BY KING LAJOS I OF HUNGARY IN 1374).

On the arch above the entrance, next to the coat of arms of Maria Theresa, on the right is that of Francis II, Holy Roman Emperor and on the left that of Joseph II, Holy Roman Emperor. In the niches of the chapel are statues of the four Hungarian saints. Stephen I of Hungary is leaning on a cross with his right hand, wearing the Hungarian crown on his head, his body covered with armour and a cloak. Ladislaus I of Hungary is also wearing a crown, holding a rudder staff in his right hand and leaning on an oval shield with his left. Saint Emeric of Hungary is also holding a baton and a lily in his hand, with his left hand on his heart. The fourth statue is of Adalbert of Prague, in episcopal regalia, leaning on his shepherd's crook with his left hand and holding a book in his right. On the inner wall on the right, a black marble plaque lists in Latin the holy kings and princesses of Hungary.

== Hungarian treasures and the Chapel of Hungary today ==
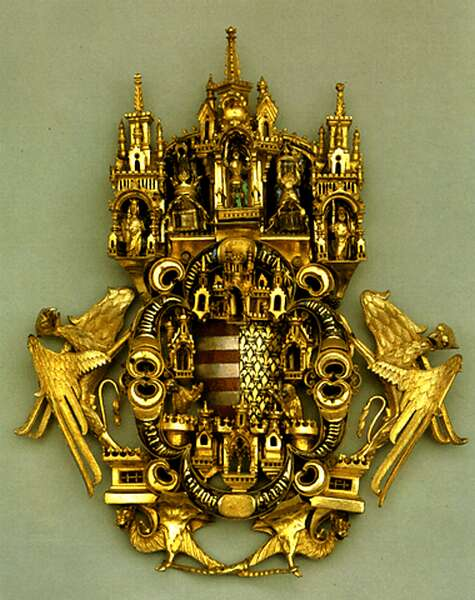
The Golden Cloak clasp of Louis I of Hungary

According to inventories recorded in 1367 and 1381, Louis I of Hungary donated two tablets to the Chapel of Hungary and a third to the cathedral. They are now kept in the treasury of the cathedral, where, among other things, the silver coffin of Charlemagne, his golden enamel bust and his hunting horn can be seen. The Madonna and Child and the Coronation of Mary are therefore only 14th-century copies of the magnificent pentagonal frames, while the paintings in the frames themselves are 18th-century copies, and are on display on the first floor of the cathedral's treasury.

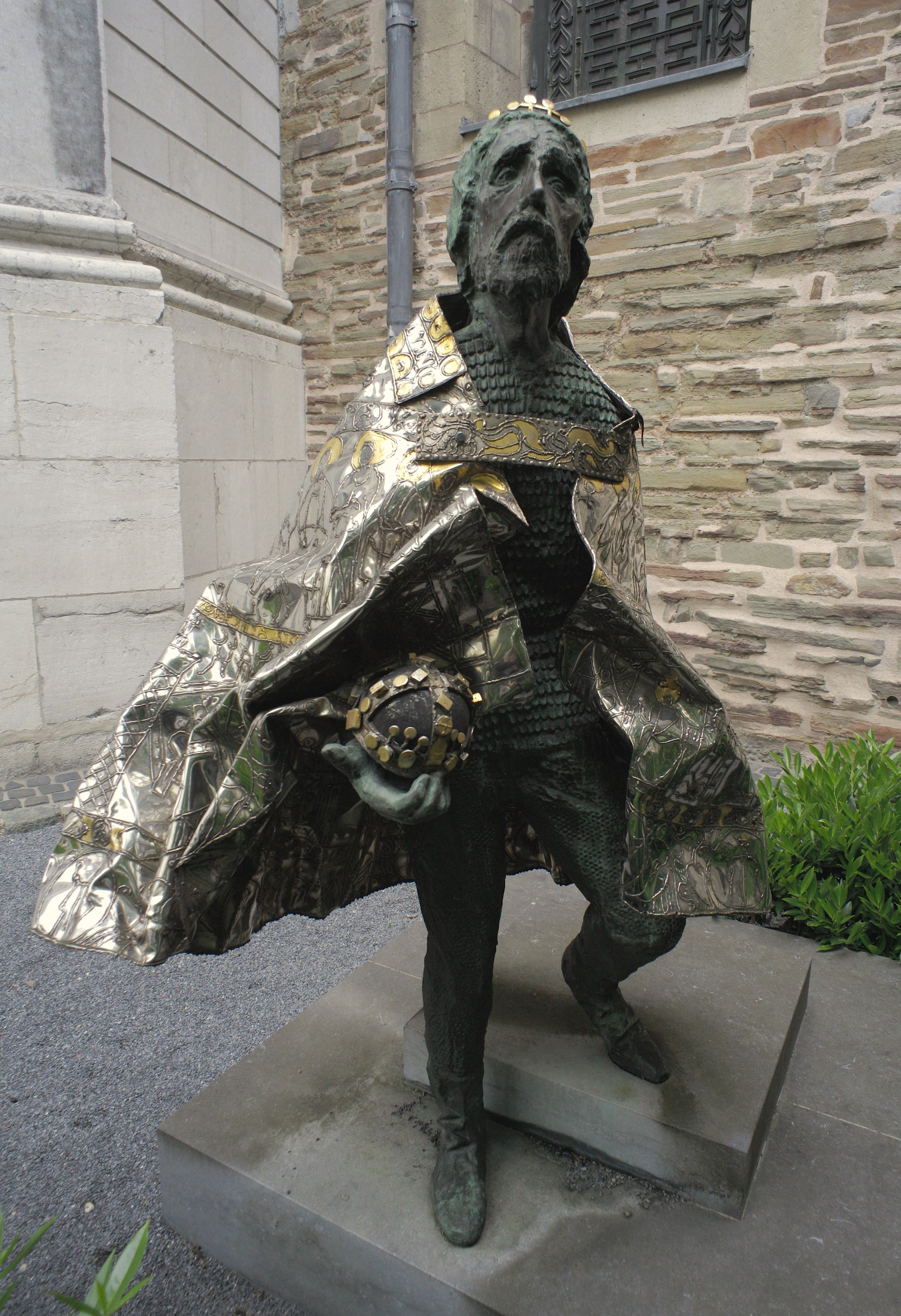
Statue of St Stephen behind the Hungarian Chapel

Nowadays, the Chapel of Hungary is located to the right of the cathedral's main entrance. Like the cathedral, the chapel is well-preserved and is used as a space for quiet prayer.

== Statue of Saint Stephen ==
In the cathedral garden stands a bronze statue of King Saint Stephen. The work, created by Imre Varga, was donated by Hungary in connection with the 1993 Heiligtumsfahrt pilgrimage, held as part of the series of Aachen pilgrimages organized every seven years. The statue was inaugurated by Prime Minister József Antall, accompanied by Hungarian pilgrims.

The statue, located beneath one of the magnolia trees, can be viewed not only from the outside, from the square, but also inside the garden, as the gate is always open. Outside the fence, in front of the statue, the following inscription can be read: SANCTVS STEPHANVS | REX APOSTOLICVS HVNGARIE | OPVS SCVLPTORIS IMRE VARGA | 1993

== Bibliography ==
- Tömöry Edith: Az aacheni magyar kápolna története. Németh József Technikai Könyvkiadó Vállalat, Budapest, 1931.
- Pór Antal: Keszei Miklós 13??-1366 Budapest A Magyar Történelmi Társulat kiadása. 1904
- Udvarhelyi Nándor: Aachen magyar kincsei
- Marianne Jungen: Die Geschichte der Kaiserstadt Aachen von den Römern bis zur Neuzeit und vieles mehr. 1. Auflage. AC-Verlag Jungen, 1995.
- Michael Römling: Aachen. Geschichte einer Stadt. Soest 2007.
