= Marshall-Brennan Constitutional Literacy Project =

Civil education program

The Marshall-Brennan Constitutional Literacy Project is civic education program in which law students work with local high schools to enhance understanding of constitutional law and oral advocacy. The project was founded in 1999 at American University's Washington College of Law in Washington, D.C., by Professor Jamie Raskin. There are now nearly 20 chapters in the United States, and there are 2 international chapters. The program began as a way of addressing civic disengagement and a lack of political participation. Through analyzing Supreme Court decisions and participating in moot court arguments, participating high school students learn about their rights as citizens, the strategic benefits of voting, how lawmaking occurs, and other fundamental constitutional processes. They also have the opportunity to compete in a national moot court competition.

== Background and creation ==
The Marshall-Brennan Constitutional Literacy Project was conceived by Congressman Jamie Raskin (D-MD) while teaching at American University Washington College of Law after he was approached by a group of high school students in Montgomery County, Maryland, who felt their freedom of speech was being violated. The students were part of a communications academy at their school and helped run a talk show on a local cable television station affiliated with the school. They had put together a program called "Shades of Gray," during which they interviewed experts on difficult topics of the day. One particular show included a debate on gay marriage, and the students had lined up two speakers in favor of gay marriage and two against. The program was taped and approved by the teacher who oversaw it.

However, the show was pulled before it aired. School officials deemed the show "inappropriate" for the station. When the students contacted him, Professor Raskin wanted to go straight to court, but the students asked for help in first exhausting all remedies at the school district level before pursuing litigation. In the end, the students appealed to the school board and won a reversal of the superintendent's censorship of the program. The program aired six times instead of the one or two times it would have aired had the superintendent allowed it in the first place.

This experience led Professor Raskin to the realization that high school students, especially urban students, are not taught about the Constitution and how it affects their daily lives. When he compared the resources he had to this need for constitutional literacy, the idea for the project was born.

The project officially started in the fall of 1999 with 20 law students who volunteered to teach in eight public schools in Washington, D.C. and Montgomery County.

== Current chapters and leadership ==
There are approximately 20 Marshall-Brennan Constitutional Literacy Project chapters.

=== Current Chapters ===
- American University Washington College of Law, Washington, D.C. (1999–present)
- Capital University Law School, Columbus, OH
- Cornell Law School, Ithaca, NY
- Howard University School of Law in Washington, D.C.
- Mitchell Hamline School of Law, Saint Paul, Minnesota
- Rutgers Law School, Camden, New Jersey
- Sandra Day O'Connor College of Law, Tempe, Arizona
- Southern University Law Center, Baton Rouge, Louisiana
- South Texas College of Law, Houston, TX
- Suffolk University Law School, Boston, Massachusetts
- Thomas R. Kline School of Law, Philadelphia, Pennsylvania
- University of Colorado Law School, Boulder, Colorado
- University of Connecticut School of Law, Hartford, Connecticut
- University of New Mexico School of Law, Albuquerque, New Mexico (2015–present)
- University of Pittsburgh School of Law, Pittsburgh, PA
- Washington and Lee University School of Law, Lexington, VA
- Washington University School of Law, St. Louis, Missouri
- University of Louisville Brandeis School of Law, Louisville, Kentucky
- Yale Law School in New Haven, Connecticut (2009–present)

=== Former Chapters ===
- Arizona Summit Law School, Phoenix, Arizona

=== Current Program Directors ===
The Marshall-Brennan Constitutional Literacy Project is currently directed by Professor Camille A. Thompson. Professor Stephen Wermiel currently serves as the faculty adviser to the program.

=== Chapter Requirements ===
Chapters must meet seven requirements:

- Partnership between a law school(s) and an underserved local public school system or local public high school(s).
- Academic credit: both law students AND high school students earn academic credit for participating in the Marshall-Brennan Project.
- Unified Curriculum: All Marshall-Brennan fellows use one or both of the textbooks (We the Students and/or Youth Justice in America)
- Shared goals: to improve high school students’ oral advocacy skills, cultivate critical thinking skills, and instill understanding of Constitutional cases and concepts.
- Support and supervision by a faculty and/or staff member at the law school.
- Regular communication with the national office at American University Washington College of Law.
- Representation at the annual Directors’ Meetings and National Marshall-Brennan High School Moot Court Competition as much as possible.

== Curriculum ==
The Marshall-Brennan Constitutional Literacy Project utilizes two different text books for its two sets of curriculum: Youth Justice in America and We the Students. Both books utilize case law and constitutional analysis to walk students through complex legal issues in an easy to understand fashion. Youth Justice in America focuses on criminal law and criminal procedure as they pertain to students, while We the Students gives students a broad survey of the United States Constitution.

Teaching fellows are involved in curriculum design, lesson planning, classroom teaching, and the organization of moot court competitions.

=== Observance of Constitution Day ===
In honor of Constitution Day, the Marshall-Brennan Constitutional Literacy Project prepares lesson plans and educational materials to be used by teachers who wish to educate their students about the importance of the U.S. Constitution and its very real effect on the lives of students. The prepared materials are distributed through the website Band of Rights.

== National Marshall-Brennan High School Moot Court Competition ==
The National Marshall-Brennan Moot Court Competition serves as an opportunity for high school students participating in Marshall-Brennan Constitutional Literacy Project classes to showcase their oral advocacy skills, network, and learn about careers in the law.

Usually held in the Spring, the National Moot Court Competition presents high school students with a unique legal issue each year, ranging from First Amendment violations to Eighth Amendment prohibitions against placing juveniles in prison for life without parole. Each student is assigned the role of either Petitioner or Respondent and must argue their case in front of a three judge panel composed of law students, law professors, and practicing attorneys. After advancing through the preliminary rounds, the final rounds are often heard by actual judges who volunteer their time in order to help students garner an understanding of a real appellate level courtroom.

=== Notable Speakers ===
During the National Moot Court Competition in 2012, Mary Beth Tinker of the famous Supreme Court case Tinker v. Des Moines Independent Community School District spoke to the competitors about the importance of knowing one's rights and of knowing how the justice system can affect their everyday lives.
