= 100D =

100D may refer to:

- Canon EOS 100D DSLR camera introduced in 2013
- Tesla Model S 100D, all-electric sedan
- Tesla Model X 100D, all-electric cross-over SUV (XUV/CUV)
- Atlas 100D, the rocket used in Mercury-Atlas 3

== See also ==
- D100 (disambiguation)
- 100 (disambiguation)
