= Ira Robbins =

Ira Robbins may refer to:

- Ira Robbins, editor and publisher of Trouser Press
- Ira Robbins, President and CEO of Valley Bank
- Ira P. Robbins, legal scholar and professor of law specializing in criminal law
