= 100 (disambiguation) =

100 is the natural number following 99 and preceding 101.

100 may also refer to:

== Time ==
- 100 BC
- 100s BC (decade), Before the Common Era
- 100s BC, the 2nd century BC, a century Before the Common Era
- AD 100
- AD 100s (decade), a decade in the Common Era
- AD 100s, the 2nd century AD, a century in the Common Era

== Film ==
- 100 (2008 film), a Filipino film
- 100 (2019 film), an Indian film
- 100 (2021 film), an Indian film

== Television ==
- "One Hundred" (Aqua Teen Hunger Force), an episode of Aqua Teen Hunger Force
- "One Hundred" (Big City Greens), an episode of Big City Greens
- "100" (Criminal Minds), an episode of Criminal Minds
- "100" (Fear the Walking Dead), an episode of Fear the Walking Dead
- "100" (Glee), an episode of Glee
- "100" (30 Rock), an episode of 30 Rock

== Music and audio ==
- 100 (audio drama), based on Doctor Who
- 100 (EP), 2014, by KB
- 100 (album), by Andy Stochansky
- 100, an album by Dear Jane
- "One Hundred", a song by NF from the album Perception
- "100" (The Game song) (2015)
- "100" (SuperM song) (2020)
- Z100 (New York), an iHeartRadio station in New York City

== Places ==
- Highway 100, any of several routes labelled "100"; see List of highways numbered 100
- 100 Hekate (asteroid #100), the asteroid Hekate, the 100th numbered minor planet, an asteroid discovered in 1868
- 100 Club, a music venue in London, England, UK
- Siu Hong stop (MTR digital station code 100), a Light Rail stop in Tuen Mun, Hong Kong

== Transportation ==
- Route 100 (MBTA), a bus route in Massachusetts
- Audi 100, a mid-sized executive car, precursor of Audi A6
  - Audi 100 Coupé S, a coupé variant of the Audi 100
- Škoda 100, a small family sedan
- Various Rover models:
  - Rover 100, a saloon
  - Rover 100, a supermini car

== Other uses ==
- 100 (DC Comics), fictional organized crime groups appearing in DC Comics
- 100 (emergency telephone number), in several countries
- 100 (play), produced by TheImaginaryBody
- Lenovo IdeaPad 100, a discontinued brand of notebook computers
- 100 Hekate, a main-belt asteroid
- "100!!", a storyline in the science fiction comedy webtoon series Live with Yourself!

== See also ==
- 100th (disambiguation)
- 100 (comics), a list of comics topics with 100 in the title
- 100s (disambiguation)
- The 100 (disambiguation)
- "100 A.D." (American Dad!), an episode of American Dad!
- 100% (disambiguation)
- 100 points (disambiguation)
- Fermium, chemical element with atomic number 100
- 100 series (disambiguation)
- Hundred (disambiguation)
- 10 (disambiguation), for some values 10.0
- 1 (disambiguation), for some values 1.00
