= American University Washington College of Law =

Private law school in Washington, D.C., US

- Seal of the school
- Motto: Champion What Matters
- Parent school: American University
- Established: February 1, 1896; 130 years ago
- School type: Private law school
- Parent endowment: $908.9 million (2022)
- Dean: Michael Barry
- Location: Washington, D.C., U.S. 38°56′43″N 77°04′50″W
- Enrollment: 1,167 (2022)
- Faculty: 259 (2022)
- USNWR ranking: 98th (2024)
- Bar pass rate: 73.02% (2022)
- Website: american.edu/wcl/
- ABA profile: ABA profile

The American University Washington College of Law (AUWCL or WCL) is the law school of American University, a private research university in Washington, D.C., United States. It is accredited by the American Bar Association.

Begun in 1896, the college was the first law school founded by women, the first with a female dean, and the first to graduate an all-female class.

== History ==
=== Early beginnings ===
Ellen Spencer Mussey and Emma Gillett began teaching in Mussey's law offices in 1898 after they were approached by three women who wished to study with them. Not originally intending to create a full-fledged law school, they requested the law school of Columbian College to accept the six women for their final year. When Columbian refused the request on the ground that "women did not have the mentality for law," the two women became determined to complete the students' education themselves and found a co-educational law school that was specifically open to women. Although Gillett was a graduate of Howard University School of Law, Washington College of Law only accepted white applicants.

With its first graduating class, the Washington College of Law became the first law school founded by women, the first with a female dean, and the first law school to graduate an all-female class. Mussey's male law clerk enrolled in 1897, making the school officially coeducational.

=== Continuing growth ===
Washington, D.C. incorporated WCL in 1898. After several temporary locations, the school moved to the Le Droit Building on 8th & F Streets in 1900. Enrollment rose to 55 students by 1908 and doubled in five years to 128 students. Dean Mussey secured a lease in 1909 in the Chesley Building on New York Ave until the school outgrew the six-classroom lease. The school moved to its first permanent home in 1920, the former residence of Robert G. Ingersoll on K Street. Continually growing, WCL moved in 1924 to the former home of Oscar Underwood and former residence of Archibald Butt. WCL merged with American University in 1949 and graduated its first African American student in 1953.

The Women & the Law Program was launched in 1948, to promote the integration of women's rights and gender studies into legal education, practice and doctrine.

After years of work by Dean Myers, the John Sherman Myers Law School building was constructed on the American University main campus and dedicated in 1963 by Chief Justice Earl Warren. In the same year, U.S. Senator Robert Byrd (D-W.Va.) graduated from WCL after ten years of night-study classes, the first time a sitting member of Congress had begun and completed a law degree while serving.

By 1988, WCL had grown to over 1,000 students. Dean Milstein pushed for a new building, and in 1996 WCL moved less than a mile to The John Sherman Myers and Alvina Reckman Myers Law Center on Massachusetts Avenue in the American University Park section of Northwest Washington, D.C. The building was two and a half times larger than the previous Myers building and included the new Pence Law Library.

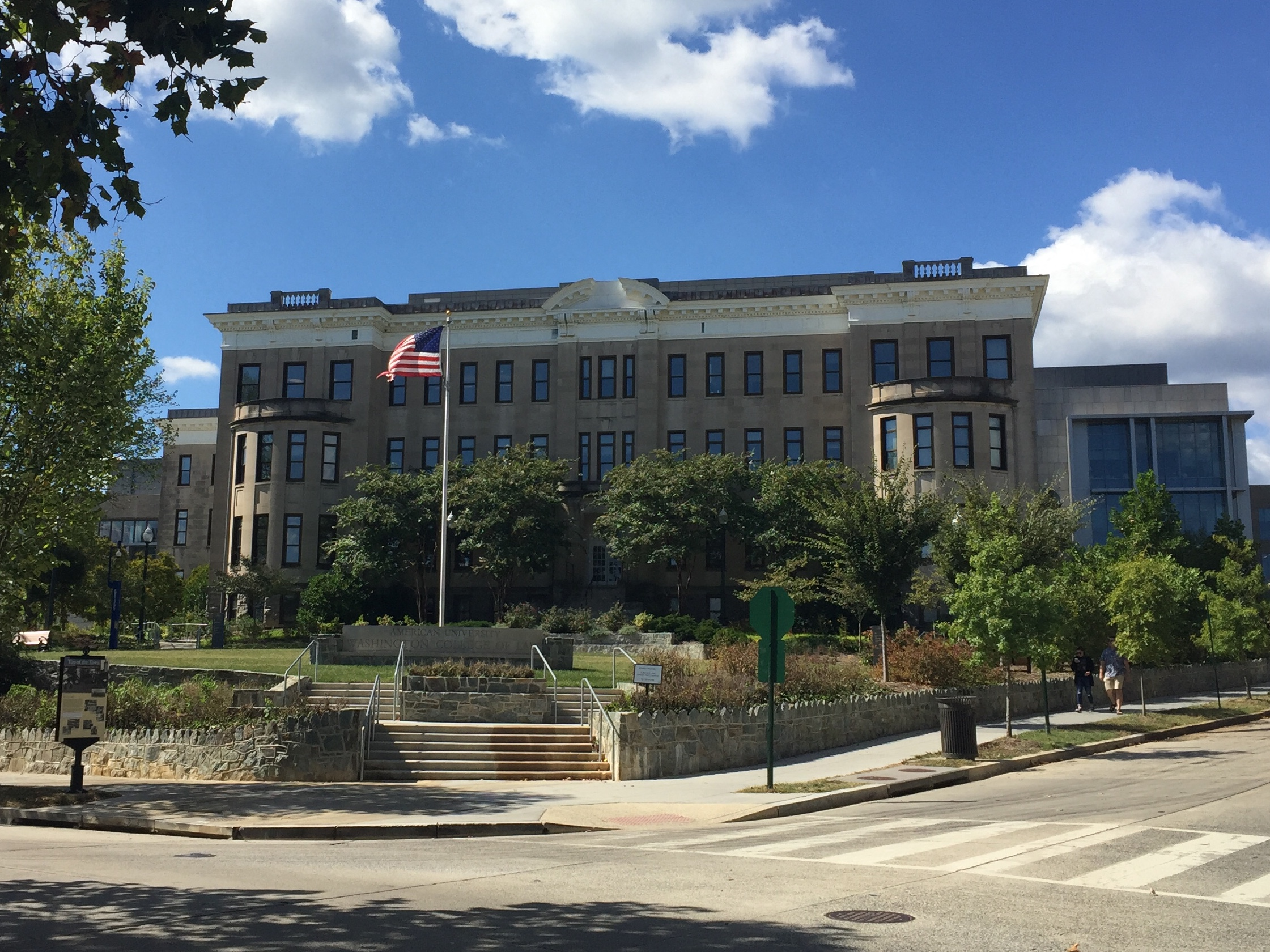
View of the American University Washington College of Law's Capital Building from Tenley Circle

=== Move to Tenley Campus ===
In April 2012, the D.C. Zoning Commission approved the plans for American University Washington College of Law to relocate from Spring Valley to American University's Tenley Campus. The approval of plans for further processing and zoning variances for the law school was handed down after American University's full campus plan was approved in March. Construction began in the summer of 2013, with the relocation of the law school to the new campus completed in early 2016. Spring 2016 semester classes began at the new campus on January 11, 2016.

== Campus and facilities ==
The Washington College of Law is located on American University's Tenley Campus at 4300 Nebraska Avenue NW. on the northwest edge of Washington, D.C., approximately 1 mile from the Maryland state line. Construction on the Tenley Campus was completed in early 2016 and included three primary buildings:

- Capital Hall - Historically preserved and renovated, this building includes administrative offices, student publications, four courtrooms, two classrooms, and an atrium.
- Warren Building - Brand new construction, housing the Pence Law Library on two and a half floors, nine classrooms, the ceremonial courtroom, an active learning lab, and a roof deck.
- Yuma Building - Brand new construction, housing 13 classrooms, faculty offices, clinical and international programs, dining, and Claudio Grossman Hall, which seats 500.

The law school campus is less than a mile from the main American University campus; however, a shuttle system is available for students and staff to travel between the two locations. The campus is accessible to students and faculty 24/7 with the use of an AU ID card.

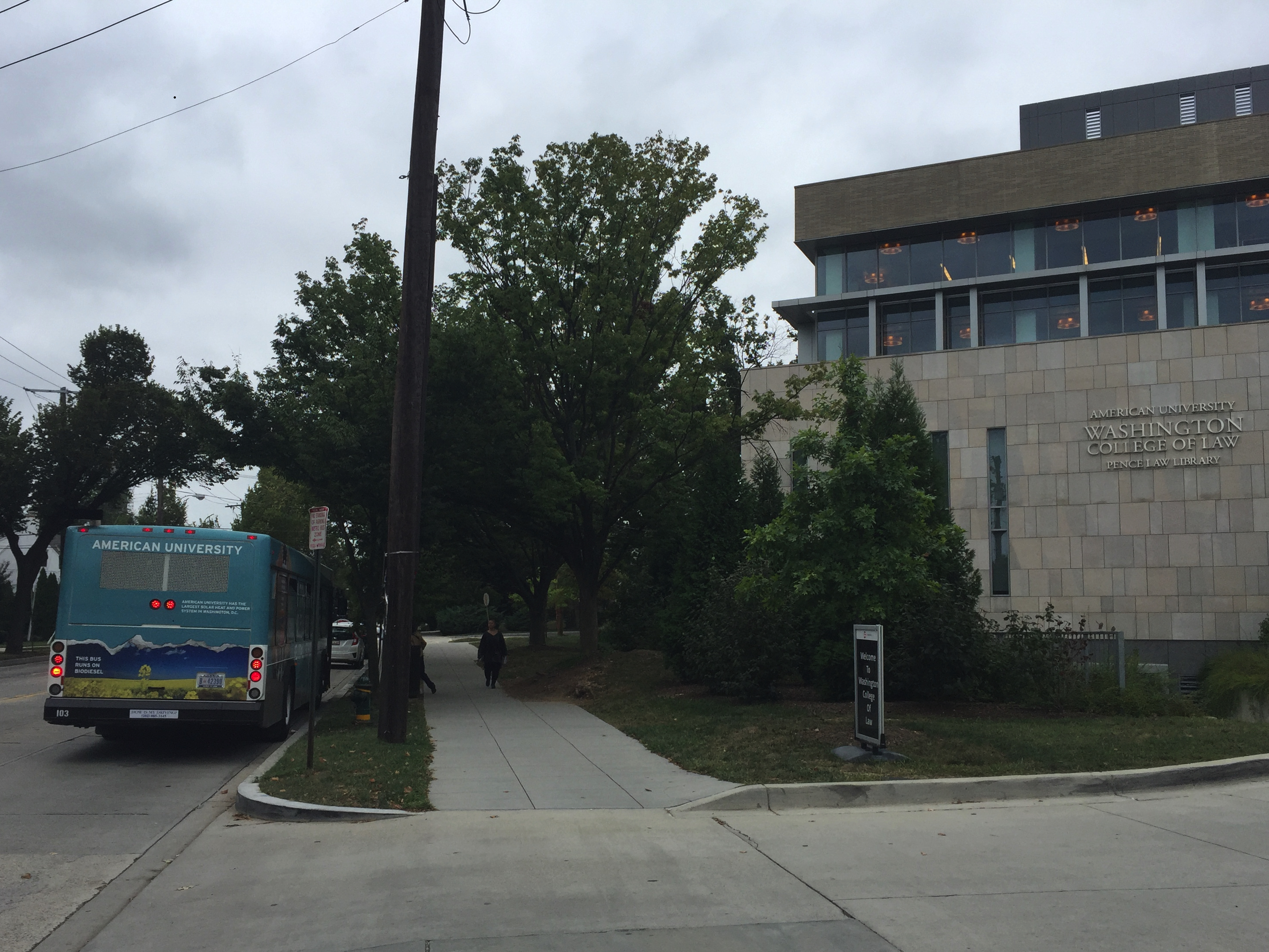
An American University shuttle stops in front of Pence Law Library at the Washington College of Law

=== Pence Law Library ===
The Pence Law Library is 54,000 square feet (5,000 m^{2}), with more than 600,000 volumes, access to multiple databases, 14 group-study rooms and seating for over 600. The library is open 24 hours a day, seven days a week to students and faculty with the use of an AU ID card.

The library collection includes European Community and US government depositories and the Baxter Collection in International Law. Students and faculty also have access to the university's library, the Library of Congress, specialized agency libraries, and other area law libraries electronically.

The National Jurist placed WCL's Library 41st out of 199 in its Best Law Libraries ranking.

== Academics ==
WCL's Master of Laws (LL.M.) program ranked 13th nationally in the 2012 AUAP rankings. The Brian Leiter Law School rankings placed the WCL 47th in the 2012 Top 70 Law Faculties in Scholarly Impact. National Jurist ranked WCL the fifth best law school for Hispanic students in 2008. It ranked WCL the 4th best public interest law school in the nation.

WCL is ranked tied for 89th in the nation among the 197 ranked schools in the Best Law Schools by U.S. News & World Report, and has ranked specialty programs in Clinical Training (tied #1), Trial Advocacy (tied #15), Part-Time Law (tied #16), International Law (tied #5), Intellectual Property (tied #7), and Health Care Law (tied #20), as well as program rankings in Legal Writing (tied #104), Business/Corporate (tied #60), Contracts/Commercial Law (tied #64), and Dispute Resolution (tied #64).

The school maintains programs in both human rights and public interest law. WCL's Equal Justice Foundation (EJF) provides scholarships to students who obtain unpaid summer internships with public interest organizations.

=== Enrollment ===
In 2021, the school had an acceptance rate of 37.94%. The 75th, 50th and 25th percentile undergraduate GPAs were 3.71, 3.57 and 3.39 respectively, while LSAT percentiles were 163, 161 and 157 respectively.

There was 36% minority representation and 64% female representation in the 2021 entering class, with representation from 42 states and 28 countries.

=== Degrees offered ===
WCL offers the Juris Doctor (J.D.), Master of Laws (LL.M.) in either international or constitutional law, and Doctor of Juridical Science (S.J.D.) degrees. The Washington College of Law now offers an online Master of Legal Studies degree.

Additionally, students can enroll in one of several dual degree programs:

- J.D./M.A. program with the School of International Service
- J.D./M.B.A. and LL.M/M.B.A. programs with the Kogod School of Business
- J.D/M.P.P and LL.M./M.P.P. with the School of Public Affairs,
- J.D./J.D. with the University of Ottawa in Canada
- J.D./Master I/Master II with the Paris Nanterre University in France
- J.D./LL.M. with the Universidad Carlos III in Spain
- J.D./LL.M. with the Universidad Pontificia Comillas in Spain
- J.D./LL.M. with LUISS Guido Carli in Italy

=== Clinical program ===
WCL's clinical program is one of the most comprehensive in the nation. The school was one of the first law schools to develop a modern clinical legal education program. With over 200 students participating in the 11 clinics every year, the program is one of the largest in the country.

The clinic serves various clients, including immigrants and refugees, victims/survivors of domestic violence, juveniles, criminal defendants, low-income taxpayers, individuals seeking help with family law, consumer, disability, and intellectual property issues, community groups, and nonprofit organizations.

Clinics include the General Practice Clinic, Community and Economic Development Law Clinic, Criminal Justice Clinic, DC Law Students in Court Clinic, Disability Rights Law Clinic, Domestic Violence Law Clinic, Janet R. Spragens Federal Tax Clinic, Glushko-Samuelson Intellectual Property Law Clinic, Immigrant Justice Clinic, International Human Rights Law Clinic, and Women and the Law Clinic.

=== Programs and centers ===
- Academy on Human Rights and Humanitarian Law
- Center for Human Rights and Humanitarian law
- Clinical Program
- Externship Program
- Geneva Centre on Knowledge Governance (jointly with the Geneva Graduate Institute
- Health Law Project
- Hospitality & Tourism Law Program
- Humphrey Fellowship Program (Fulbright Exchange)
- Center on International Commercial Arbitration
- International Legal Studies Program (ILSP)
- International Visiting Scholars Program
- Marshall-Brennan Constitutional Literacy Project
- National Institute of Military Justice
- National Institute of Corrections/WCL Project on Addressing Prison Rape
- Office of Public Interest
- Program on Information Justice and Intellectual Property
- Program on International and Comparative Environmental Law
- Program on Law & Government
- Special Events & Continuing Legal Education
- Trial Advocacy Program
- UNROW Human Rights Impact Litigation Clinic
- War Crimes Research Office
- Women & International Law Program
- Women & the Law Program

WCL participates in several popular study-abroad and student exchange programs with universities worldwide.

In 2002, the Jessup Moot Court Team was the top-ranked team in the United States and third in the World.

=== Online programs ===
WCL offers an online Master of Legal Studies (MLS) created for professionals who have law-related responsibilities. The MLS program provides professionals in a variety of industries with an understanding of the U.S. legal system, but it is not meant for students who want to become a practicing attorney. The program offers the following concentration tracks: General MLS, Business, Health Care Compliance, and Technology. Each concentration features fundamental legal training and industry-specific knowledge to improve students' ability to make informed decisions and legitimize their credibility with clients, co-workers, and partners. The MLS can be completed in as little as 15 months and does not require a GRE/LSAT.

=== Costs and student debt ===
The total cost of attendance (indicating the cost of tuition, fees, and living expenses) at WCL for the 2021–2022 academic year is $82,842. The Law School Transparency estimated debt-financed cost of attendance for three years is $293,573. According to U.S. News & World Report, the average indebtedness of 2020 AUWCL graduates who incurred law school debt was $159,723 (not including undergraduate debt), and 76% of 2020 graduates took on debt.

=== Employment outcomes ===
According to WCL's official 2020 ABA-required disclosures, 61.8% of the class of 2020 obtained full-time, long-term, JD-required employment nine months after graduation, and 15% were employed in J.D.-preferred positions. Thirteen percent of the class of 2020 were seeking employment 9 months after graduation.

== Publications ==
=== Law Reviews ===
- The American University Law Review
- Administrative Law Review, the official publication of the American Bar Association Section of Administrative Law and Regulatory Practice
- The American University International Law Review (which publishes ASIL's annual Grotius Lecture).
- The American University Business Law Review
- The American University Journal of Gender, Social Policy & the Law

=== Other Publications ===
- The Alternative Dispute Resolution Newsletter
- The Arbitration Brief
- The American Jurist
- American University Labor & Employment Law Brief
- The Criminal Law Brief
- Health Law & Policy Brief
- The Human Rights Brief
- The Intellectual Property Brief
- International Commercial Arbitration Brief
- Legislation & Policy Brief
- The Modern American
- National Security Law Brief
- Sustainable Development Law & Policy

== Notable people ==
=== Current and former faculty ===
- Robert Byrd
- Louis Caldera
- Michael W. Carroll
- Lia Epperson
- Claudio Grossman
- Lewis A. Grossman
- Kristine Huskey
- Cynthia E. Jones
- Ralph Nader, political activist and author
- Nanette B. Paul
- Jamie Raskin
- Ira P. Robbins
- Brenda V. Smith
- Gregory Stanton
- Michael Tigar
- Perry Wallace, first African American scholarship athlete in the Southeastern Conference
- Stephen Wermiel
- Paul Williams
- Judith A. Winston
- Richard Verma
