= Emma Gillett =

American lawyer (1852–1927)

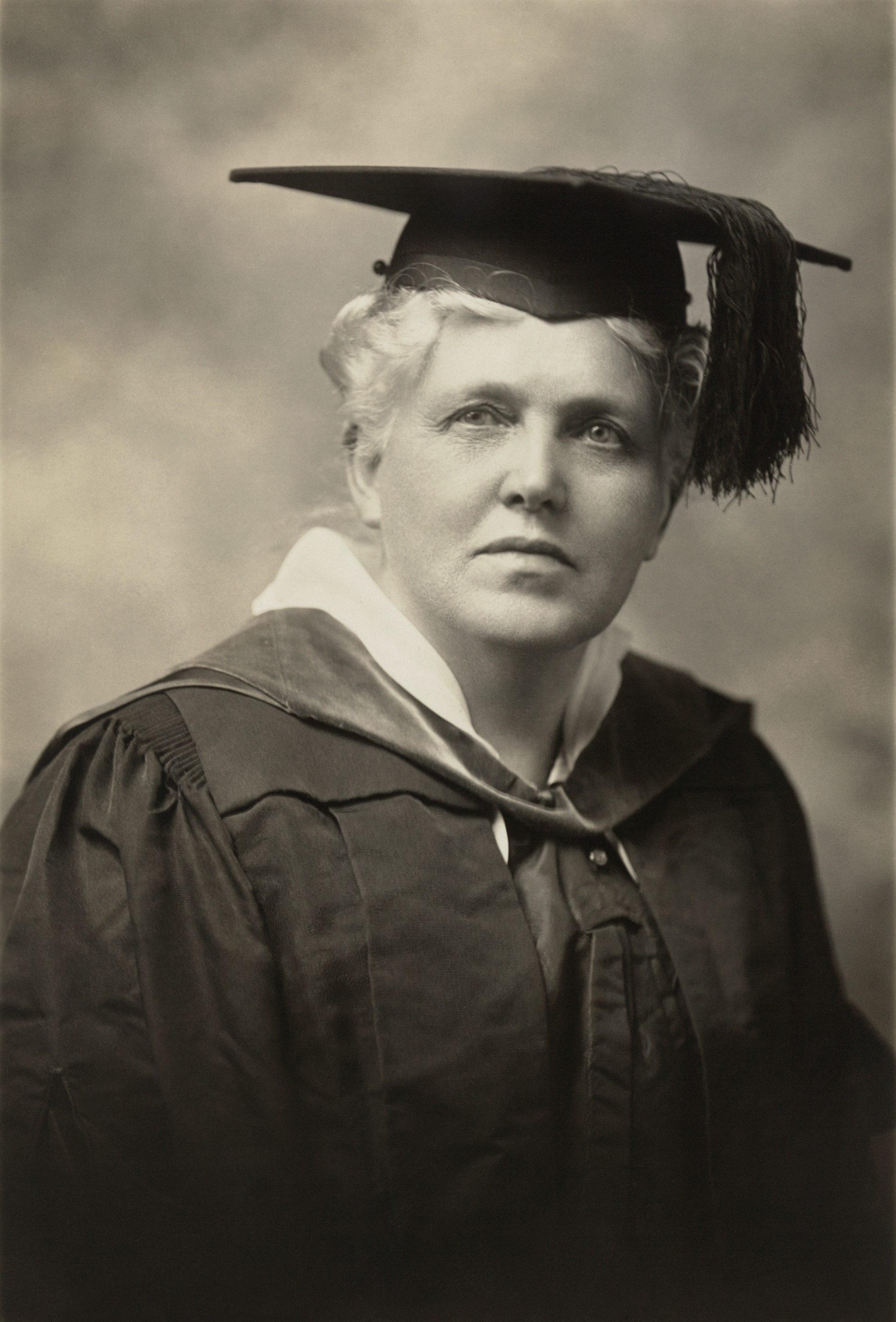
- Born: July 30, 1852; Princeton, Wisconsin, U.S.
- Died: January 23, 1927 (aged 74); Washington, D.C., U.S.
- Education: Lake Erie College (BA); Howard University (LLB, LLM)

Emma Millinda Gillett (July 30, 1852 – January 23, 1927) was an American lawyer and women's rights activist who played a pivotal role in the advancement of legal studies for women. After local law schools refused to admit her because of her sex, she was admitted by Howard University, a historically black university. Yet the Washington College of Law, which she founded in 1898, did not accept people of color until 1950.

== Early background ==
Gillett was born on July 30, 1852, in Princeton, Wisconsin, to Wisconsin homesteaders. She was educated in Girard, Pennsylvania, where her family moved following her fathers death in 1954. In 1870, she graduated from Lake Erie College and taught for the following ten years in the Pennsylvania public school system. Gillett's frustration with how single women teachers were being treated and their wages sparked her eagerness to pursue legal studies for women and advocate for their representation and equality.

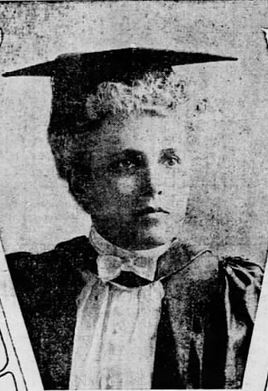
Emma Gillett, 1902

== Educational career ==
After the death of her mother, Gillett took over her mother's estate. The challenges of legal matters, especially the ones that involved women's property rights motivated Gillett's desire to pursue legal studies. Gillett knew the process would be difficult, but after hearing about Belva Lockwood, who was the first woman authorized to practice law before the Supreme Court, she decided to move to Washington in hopes of following in Lockwood's footsteps. Unfortunately, Gillet had to overcome more obstacles after this point because many law schools were not interested in admitting women.

Gillett did eventually gain admission to Howard University and went on to graduate from there in 1882 with a Bachelor of Law degree, followed in 1883 with a Master of Laws degree. She passed the bar in the District of Columbia the same year. In continued to become the first woman to be appointed a notary public by President Garfield of the United States.

After graduating from Howard, Gillett formed a law partnership with a man named Watson J. Newton, after being his associate for eighteen years. She chose to pursue a career in real estate and pension law.

== Early career ==
As Gillett became more involved in legal matters, her colleague and friend, Ellen Spencer Mussey, sought her assistance in the education of women in the field of law. Mussey had been approached in 1895 by Delia Sheldon Jackson, an aspiring attorney, to apprentice her as a student of law. Realizing both the scope of the task and the significance of the opportunity, Mussey sought out the assistance of Gillett. The two opened the first session of the Woman's Law Class on February 1, 1896. The class had an enrollment of three: Jackson and two other women, Nanette Paul and Helen Malcolm.

Within a few years, the program had expanded, and several prominent Washington, D.C., attorneys were brought in to assist Although Mussey and Gillett had not intended to establish an independent law school, when Columbian College (now George Washington University) rejected their request to take on the women they had educated for their final year of education—on grounds that "women did not have the mentality for law". In response to this, the two decided to establish a co-educational law school specifically open to women.

In April 1898, the Washington College of Law– which merged with American University in 1949 – was incorporated in Washington, D.C. Washington College of Law founded by Mussey and Gillett was the first law school in the world to be founded by women. Mussey and Gillett wanted to create a space for women to continue to grow in the law field, but they still wanted gender equality. As a result, Washington College of Law had a coeducation foundation.

== Accomplishments ==
Between 1893 and 1896 Gillett worked with Ellen Spencer Mussey to help married women with property rights and she played a key role in drafting property legislation for Washington. In 1890, she continued to support women's education and career opportunities so she founded an all women's organization called the Wimodausis club. The purpose of this club was to advocate for women's standing in society and support them through their educational and working careers.

Responding to the written invitation issued by Mussey, calling an initial meeting of "an association of women lawyers in the District of Columbia" on May 17, 1917, 29 other women lawyers joined Gillett and Mussey as charter members of the Women's Bar Association of the District of Columbia. Gillet served as the president of the association. At that time, only New York City, Chicago, and Omaha had organized women's bar associations.

Gillett held many additional roles, including Vice President for the District of Columbia of the American Bar Association in 1922; President of the State Suffrage Association of the District.

At the time of her death was Dean Emeritus of the Washington College of Law and Chairman of the Legal Branch of the National Woman's Party.

== Death ==
Gillett died on January 23, 1927, after contracting pneumonia while confined to her bed after breaking her hip the previous October.
