= Center on International Commercial Arbitration =

The Center on International Commercial Arbitration at the American University's Washington College of Law (WCL) was founded in 2004, and provides academic training and a discussion forum for issues and developments in commercial arbitration. Its director is Horacio A. Grigera Naón, an independent international arbitrator and former Secretary General of the International Court of Arbitration of the International Chamber of Commerce. In addition to seminars and discussions with practitioners, the Center hosts three annual programs: a summer program on international commercial arbitration, an annual seminar on international commercial arbitration and an annual lecture on international arbitration. Most of the events offer continuing legal education (CLE) credit.

== Academic Programs and Training ==
The Center operates an online program, for which students who pass receive an Online Certificate in International Commercial Arbitration. The curriculum includes the legal principles and practical implications of international commercial arbitration and international investment arbitration.

The Center also runs a three-week summer program for professional development, where professional arbitrators and practitioners present six seminars in English and three in Spanish. The program is intended for advanced students and practitioners, on the theory and practice of handling arbitration cases under various arbitration systems. Sessions may be taken for a Certificate of Attendance, Certificate of Completion (Diploma) and CLE Credit.

The Center provides an annual moot competition for LL.M. candidates. It also organizes an investment arbitration competition in Spanish only, la Competencia de Arbitraje Internacional de Inversión, with Centro de Arbitraje y Conciliación, Cámara de Comercio de Bogotá and Universidad Externado. The event is sponsored by ICSID.

== Publications ==
The Arbitration Brief is a student publication at American University Washington College of Law.
