= The 100 =

The 100 or The Hundred may refer to:

== Arts and entertainment ==
- 100 (DC Comics), fictional organized crime groups appearing in DC Comics
- The 100 (film), a 2025 Indian action crime thriller film
- The 100 (novel series), a 2013–2016 science fiction novel series written by Kass Morgan
- The 100 (TV series), 2014–2020 American post-apocalyptic drama based on Kass Morgan's novel series
- The Hundred with Andy Lee, a 2021 Australian comedy, panel television game show

== Other uses ==
- The 100: A Ranking of the Most Influential Persons in History, a 1978 book by Michael H. Hart
- The One Hundred (band), an electronic and metal crossover band from London
- The Hundreds, a U.S. streetwear brand
- The Hundred (cricket), a professional 100-ball cricket league in England and Wales

== See also ==
- Centurion, commander of a unit called a hundred
- Hundred (disambiguation)
- 100 (disambiguation)
