= Michael Berry =

Michael Berry may refer to:

- Michael Berry (athlete) (born 1991), American sprinter
- Michael Berry (physicist) (born 1941), British mathematical physicist
- Michael Berry (radio host) (born 1970), American talk show host
- Michael Berry, Baron Hartwell (1911–2001), newspaper proprietor and journalist
- Michael Berry Jr. (born 1964), British actor
- Mike Berry (singer) (1942–2025), English singer and actor
- Mike "Cannonball" Berry (1911–1992), American Negro league baseball player
- Michael Berry (author) (1974), American author and translator

== See also ==
- Mike O'Berry (born 1954), former catcher in Major League Baseball
- Michael Barry (disambiguation)
