= Reuben D. Mussey =

American physician and writer

Reuben Dimond Mussey
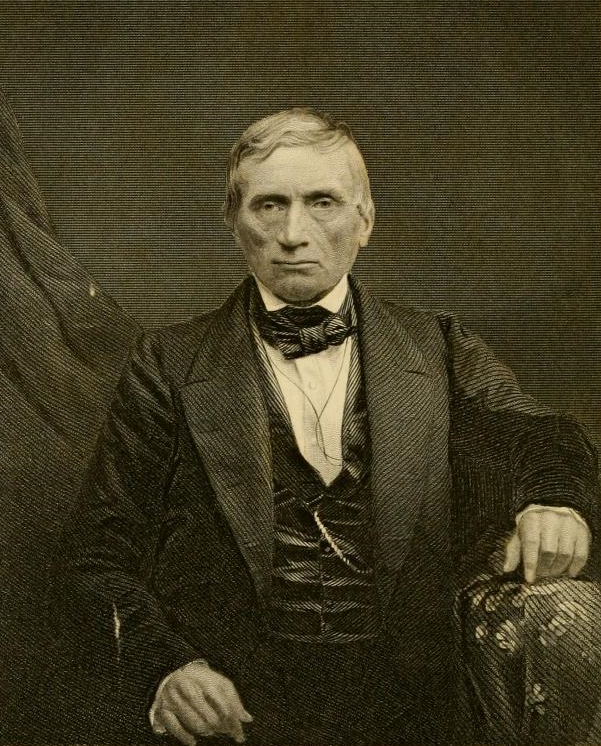
- Born: June 23, 1780; Rockingham County, New Hampshire
- Died: June 21, 1866 (aged 85); Boston
- Occupations: Physician, writer

Reuben Dimond Mussey, Sr. (June 23, 1780 – June 21, 1866) was an American medical doctor, surgeon, vegetarian and an early opponent of tobacco. He was the fourth president of the American Medical Association.

== Biography ==
Mussey was born on June 23, 1780, in Rockingham County, New Hampshire. He was of French Huguenot descent, and his father, John Mussey, was also a medical doctor. Mussey studied at Dartmouth College and then learned medicine under Nathan Smith. He began the practice of medicine in Essex County, Massachusetts. However, he then went to the University of Pennsylvania School of Medicine where he did further medical studies, graduating M.D. in 1809. Among his professors at the University of Pennsylvania was Benjamin Rush. Mussey was elected an Associate Fellow of the American Academy of Arts and Sciences in 1811.

He then was a professor at the medical school at Dartmouth College and also at Middlebury College, as well as serving as a medical lecturer at other institutions. Mussey is credited as the first surgeon to tie both carotid arteries in 1829. He lectured on anatomy and surgery at Bowdoin College (1831–1835) and Fairfield Academy (1836–1838). He was professor of surgery at the Medical College of Ohio (1838–1852) and was chair of surgery at Miami Medical College in Cincinnati (1852–1857).

Mussey was an advocate of the temperance movement. In 1828, a temperance society was founded at Dartmouth. In 1850 he served as president of the American Medical Association.

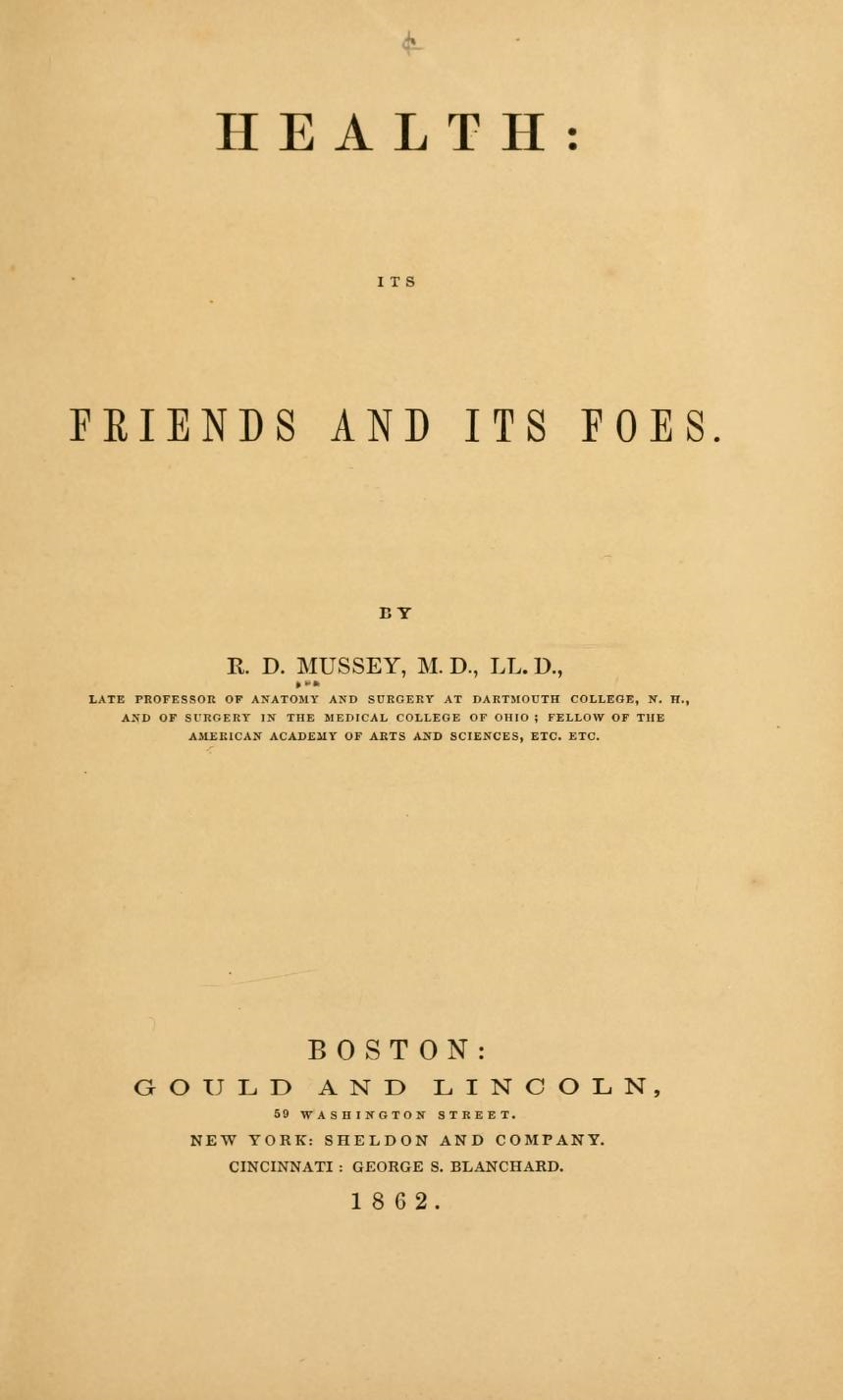
Health: Its Friends and Foes, 1862

He was awarded an LL.D from Dartmouth in 1854 and an honorary A. M. in 1806 from Harvard University.

Mussey died on June 21, 1866, in Boston.

== Family ==
His son Reuben D. Mussey, Jr. was a lawyer and the husband of Ellen Spencer Mussey, the founder of the first law school for females.

Mussey and his first wife Mary Sewall did not have any children. After her death he married Herry Osgood, and they had nine children. Besides Reuben Jr., there was also William H. Mussey and Francis B. Mussey who both followed their father into the medical profession. Charles F. Mussey became a Presbyterian minister. Mussey's daughter Maria married Lyman Mason, and his daughter Catharine married Shattuck Hartwell.

== Vegetarianism ==
Mussey was a vegetarian who abstained from alcohol and tobacco. In 1832, Mussey "gave up the eating of flesh as an experiment", he did not eat the flesh of land animals for the rest of his life but occasionally consumed fish in 1850. He was a frequent contributor to William Alcott's vegetarian journal Library of Health. His 1862 book Health: Its Friends and Foes included chapters on vegetarianism and on the dangers of tobacco. It was positively reviewed in the Cincinnati Lancet and Observer and The New England Journal of Medicine.

Mussey was a founding member and vice-president of the American Vegetarian Society in the 1850s.

== Selected publications ==
- Health: Its Friends and Foes (1862)
- What Shall I Drink? (1863)
