= Lewis A. Grossman =

- Born: Lewis Adam Grossman
- Spouse: Lisa Marie Rabin (m. 1994)

Academic background
- Education: Yale University (B.A.), (M.A.), (M.Phil.), (Ph.D.); Harvard Law School (J.D.)

Academic work
- Discipline: Legal scholar
- Institutions: American University Washington College of Law
- Main interests: health law, food law, drug law, administrative law, civil procedure, legal history

Lewis A. Grossman is a professor of law, historian, and legal scholar at American University Washington College of Law, specializing in food and drug law, health law, and American legal history. He has also served as a Visiting Professor of Law at Harvard Law School and Cornell Law School. In addition, he was a Law and Public Affairs (LAPA) Fellow at Princeton University.

== Early life and education ==
Lewis Grossman was born to Madeleine and Edward Grossman of Westport, Connecticut. His mother was a lawyer and his father was a gastroenterologist and an associate professor of medicine at Yale University. Grossman attended Yale University, graduating summa cum laude in 1986 and receiving a Bachelor of Arts with a distinction in history. While at Yale, Grossman was elected to Phi Beta Kappa. He also received the Katherine A. Walker Essay Prize and was a Rhodes Scholarship competition finalist for the New England District. In 2005, Grossman received a Ph.D. in history from Yale and won the George Washington Egleston Historical Prize for having the best dissertation on American history. Grossman graduated from Harvard Law School in 1990, earning a juris doctor and graduating magna cum laude. While at Harvard, he was a contestant on an episode of Jeopardy!.

== Career ==
Grossman was a law clerk for Chief Judge Abner Mikva of the U.S. Court of Appeals for the D.C. Circuit. Following his position as a law clerk, Grossman became an associate at Covington & Burling.

On February 24, 1998, Grossman testified before the Senate Labor and Human Resources Committee regarding FDA regulation of tobacco products.

Grossman began teaching at Washington College of Law in 1997. From 2008 to 2011, Grossman served as Associate Dean for Scholarship at the school. He teaches food and drug law as well as civil procedure.

From 2017-2018, Grossman was a Law and Public Affairs (LAPA) Fellow at Princeton University. During his fellowship, he worked on writing a book which he described as "discussing legal efforts and social movements throughout American history to ensure that people can take any kind of medicine they want and visit any kind of doctor they want." In October 2021, Oxford University Press published Grossman's book, titled Choose Your Medicine: Freedom of Therapeutic Choice in America.

== Publications ==
=== Books ===
- Choose Your Medicine: Freedom of Therapeutic Choice in America (Oxford University Press 2021)

=== Textbooks ===
- Food and Drug Law: Cases and Materials (with Peter Barton Hutt and Richard A. Merrill).
- Food and Drug Law, Statutory Supplement (with Peter Barton Hutt & Richard A. Merrill)
- A Documentary Companion to A Civil Action (with Robert G. Vaughn).
- Teacher’s Manual for A Documentary Companion to A Civil Action (with Robert Vaughn) (Foundation Press 2000, rev. ed. 2002).

=== Articles ===
- Langdell Upside-Down: James Coolidge Carter and the Anticlassical Jurisprudence of Anticodification, 19 Yale J.L. & Human. 149 (2007).
- The Origins of American Health Libertarianism, 13 Yale J. Health Pol'y L. & Ethics (2013).

== Personal life ==
Grossman married Lisa Rabin, a professor of Spanish and Latin American literature in 1994. Their wedding was officiated by politician and Judge Abner Mikva.
