= 100th Division =

In military terms, 100th Division or 100th Infantry Division may refer to:

== Infantry divisions ==
- 100th Jäger Division, Wehrmacht, Germany, also known as the 100th Light Infantry Division
- 100th Division (Imperial Japanese Army)
- 100th Guards Rifle Division, Soviet Union
- 100th Guards Training Motor Rifle Division, Soviet Union
- 100th Motor Rifle Division, Soviet Union
- 100th Rifle Division, Soviet Union
- 100th Division (United States)

== Aviation divisions ==
- 100th Air Division, United States

== Other divisions ==
- 100th Operational Division, Russia/Soviet Union

== See also ==
- List of military divisions by number
- 100th Brigade (disambiguation)
- 100th Regiment (disambiguation)
- 100th Squadron (disambiguation)
- 100th (disambiguation)
