= Academy on Human Rights and Humanitarian Law =

Department of the American University Washington College of Law

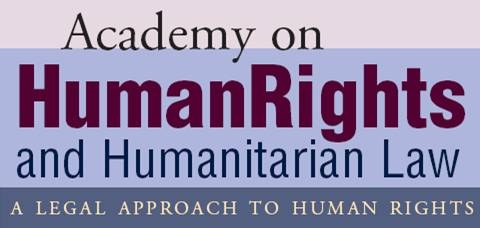
Current logo

The Academy on Human Rights and Humanitarian Law is one of many specialized departments found within the American University Washington College of Law located in Washington, D.C. Created to promote practical approaches to issues involving human rights, the Academy offers relevant, empowering training to scholars, practitioners and students interested in the international human rights system and laws.

The current co-directors of the Academy are Claudia Martin and Diego Rodríguez-Pinzón.
