= 100 (comics) =

100, in comics, may refer to:

- 100 (DC Comics), a DC Comics supervillain team
- 100% (comics), a 1992 series from Vertigo
- 100 Bullets, a series by Brian Azzarello from Vertigo
- 100 Girls (comics), a series from Arcana Studios

== See also ==
- 100 (number)
