= 100 (play) =

- Written by: Neil Monaghan; Diene Petterle; Christopher Heimann
- Characters: Ketu; Sophie; Alex; The Guide; Nia; Phil (not original character)

Premiere
- Date: August 1, 2002
- Place: Smirinoff Underbelly Theatre, Edinburgh, Scotland
- Official website

100 is a play produced by the theatrical company "TheImaginaryBody" for the Edinburgh Festival Fringe. It first appeared at the 2002 festival, where it won a Fringe First Award for 'innovation in theatre and outstanding new production'. Since then, it has played at a variety of venues around the world, including the Soho Theatre in London and the du Maurier Theatre in Toronto.

== Plot summary ==
The play centers on the afterlives of four characters who, finding themselves in a mysterious 'Void', are informed by the equally enigmatic Guide that they must choose one memory from their lives in which to spend eternity. The remainder of the play follows their individual memories and searches for self-knowledge. Although heralded at the time as new, the premise of the play is in fact quite similar to that of Japanese director Hirokazu Koreeda's 1998 film 'After Life', in which the concept was less stylized. The deaths of the characters themselves, alongside their memories, are explored throughout the play physically by the cast. Alex and Nia are told to have died from smoke inhalation, by a fire while they slept. Ketu committed suicide, unable to live with the knowledge that only he was living with the truth.

== Original Cast ==
- Jahmiy lamey - Ketu
- Hollie Freeman/Louise Dilley - Sophie
- Kyle Biggs - Alex
- Ashleigh Boyce/ Emily Armstrong - Nia
- Nemiya Berlin/James Cox - Guide

---Producer - Claire Wright-

== Secondary Cast ==
- Matthew Wilson - Ketu
- Bethany Jackson - Sophie
- Huw Smallwood - Phil
- George Hardcastle - Alex
- Ruby Barker - Nia
- Joel Britton - Guide
