= Michael Barry =

Michael, Mike, or Mick Barry may refer to:

== Entertainment ==
- Michael Barry (television producer) (1910–1988), British television producer and executive
- Michael Bukht (1941–2011), British radio executive and TV personality who used the pseudonym Michael Barry
- Michael Barry (actor), American actor
- Michael Barry (born 1946), director of the film The Second Coming of Suzanne
- Mike Barry, member of American progressive rock band Yezda Urfa

== Sports ==
- Mick Barry (bowler) (1919–2014), Irish road bowler
- Mick Barry (rugby union) (1943–2020), rugby union player who represented Australia
- Mike Barry (footballer) (born 1953), English footballer
- Mike Barry (American football) (born c. 1946), American football coach
- Michael Barry (cricketer) (born 1991), New Zealand(Auckland) cricketer
- Michael Barry (cyclist) (born 1975), Canadian racing cyclist
- Michael Barry (wrestler) (born 1954), Canadian Olympic wrestler

== Other ==
- Michael Joseph Barry (1817–1889), Irish poet and political figure
- Michael Maltman Barry (1842–1909), Scottish political activist
- Michael A. Barry (born 1948), American historian of the greater Middle East and Islamic world
- Mick Barry (Irish politician) (born 1964), Irish Socialist Party politician
- Michael Barry (murderer) (1843–1890), convicted Australian murderer
- Michael Barry (writer), Australian writer, editor of the 2003 anthology Elsewhere

== See also ==
- Barry Michael (born 1955), Australian boxer
- Michael Berry (disambiguation)
