= 100th Street =

100th Street may refer to:

- 100th Street (Manhattan)
  - 100th Street Depot
- 100th Street, a street in Los Angeles, California
- Calle 100 (Havana), 100th Street in english, street in Havana, Cuba
