= 100th United States Colored Infantry Regiment =

100th Regiment U.S. Colored Infantry
- Flag of the United States (1863–1865)
- Active: Between May 3 and June 1, 1864
- Country: United States
- Allegiance: Union
- Branch: United States Colored Troops
- Type: Infantry
- Engagements: Battle of Johnsonville; Battle of Nashville

Commanders
- Notable commanders: Colonel Reuben D. Mussey

The 100th United States Colored Infantry Regiment was an infantry regiment that was a part of the United States Colored Troops that served in the American Civil War.

The regiment served primarily in the Department of the Cumberland, performing guard duties and participating in the Nashville Campaign.

== Formation ==
The regiment was organized in Kentucky "at large" between May 3 and June 1, 1864.

It was placed under the command of Colonel Reuben D. Mussey Jr. Upon its formation, they were attached to the Defenses of the Nashville & Northwestern Railroad within the Department of the Cumberland.

== Service ==
=== Early service ===
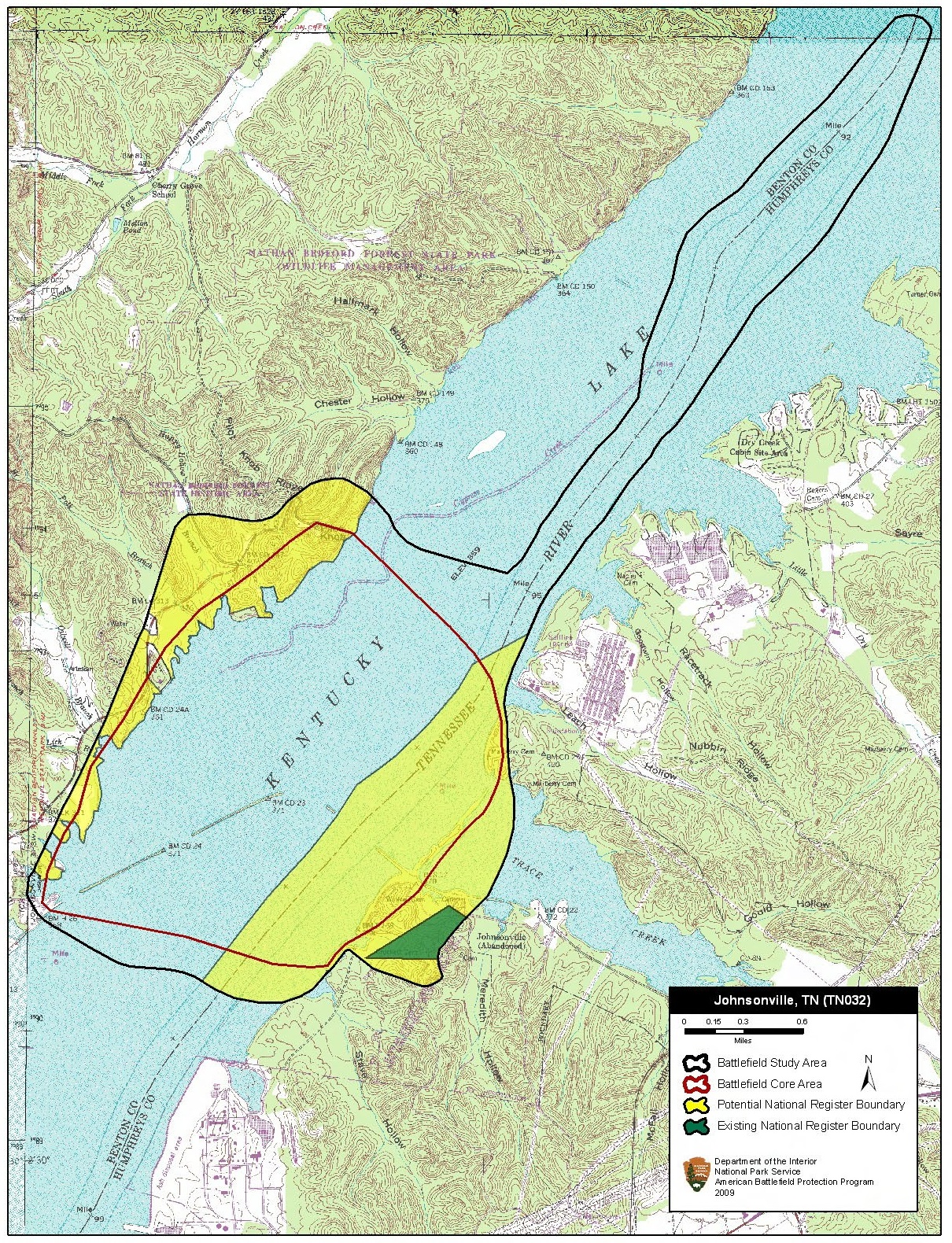
Map of Johnsonville Battlefield core and study areas by the American Battlefield Protection Program.

From its formation through December 1864, the regiment were primarily tasked with guard duty on the Nashville & Northwestern Railroad, During this period, the regiment was engaged in a skirmish along the railroad on September 4, 1864, and would later take part in the Battle of Johnsonville November 4–5, 1864.

=== Battle of Nashville ===
In December 1864, the regiment was attached to the 2nd Colored Brigade of the District of Etowah.

During the Battle of Nashville, the 100th USCI participated in the Union defense and the subsequent assault against the Confederate Army of Tennessee. On the second day of the battle, the regiment was involved in heavy fighting at Overton Hill.

Following the Union victory, the regiment would join the pursuit of General John Bell Hood's forces toward the Tennessee River, which lasted from December 17, to December 28, 1864.

In January 1865, the regiment returned to its previous assignment of guarding the Nashville and Northwestern Railroad. It remained on this duty for the duration of 1864 as the war concluded.

The 100th USCI was mustered out of Service in Nashville, Tennessee, on December 26, 1865.

== Notable commanders ==
- Colonel Reuben D. Mussey Jr.

== See also ==
- List of United States Colored Troops units in the American Civil War
