= Ellen Spencer Mussey =

American lawyer

Ellen Mussey
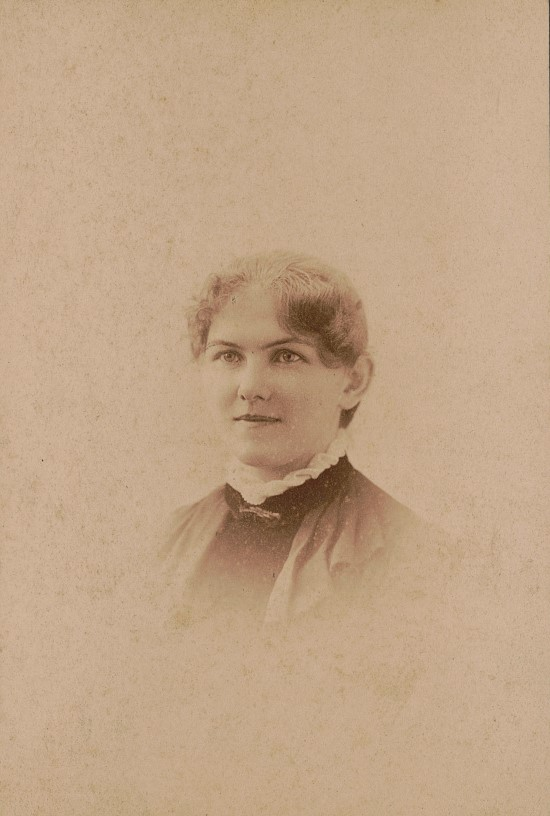

Personal details
- Born: Ellen Spencer; May 13, 1850 Geneva, Ohio, U.S.
- Died: April 21, 1936 (aged 85) Washington, D.C., U.S.
- Spouse: Reuben Mussey
- Relatives: Platt Spencer (Father)
- Education: Rice's Young Ladies' Seminary; Lake Erie College; Rockford University

Ellen Spencer Mussey (May 13, 1850 - April 21, 1936) was a lawyer, educator, and pioneer in the field of women's rights to legal education. Mussey self-tutored in the law, helped establish educational opportunities for women in that field, and campaigned to improve women's legal rights. She was the daughter of Platt Rogers Spencer, a reformer and promoter of the Spencerian Method, the widely used form of handwriting.

== Biography ==
Mussey was born on May 13, 1850, in Geneva, Ohio, United States. Between the age of 12 and the time of her father's death, when she was age 14, she was an assistant at his penmanship school. Thereafter she took up residence with relatives and attended Rice's Young Ladies' Seminary in Poughkeepsie, New York, Lake Erie College in Painesville, Ohio, and Rockford College in Rockford, Illinois.

In 1871 she married Reuben D. Mussey, a former Union Army colonel, who was nominated but not confirmed to the grade of brevet brigadier general; (Note: According to President Andrew Johnson's private secretary between April 1865 and November 1865) Despite the Eichers' statement that Reuben D. Mussey, Jr. was not confirmed as a brevet brigadier general, other sources list him as a brevet brigadier general without reservation, including the relatively recent source of Hunt, Roger D. and Jack R. Brown, Brevet Brigadier Generals in Blue. Gaithersburg, MD: Olde Soldier Books, Inc., 1990. ISBN 1-56013-002-4. p. 440. The Eichers cite Hunt and Brown but there is nothing in the Mussey entry that supports their conclusion and the editor of this footnote found nothing elsewhere in the Hunt and Brown book concerning Mussey. This means that it must be said that Mussey's full actual substantive rank was colonel and, pending the discovery of information from another definitive source, that there is a conflict in the sources as to whether or not his nomination as a brevet brigadier general ever was confirmed.) he was also a successful lawyer. Having been denied admission at the law schools of National University and Columbian College (now George Washington University), Ellen Mussey tutored herself in the field of law and underwent legal training in her husband's law office and began to practice law. Reuben Mussey died May 29, 1892, which might have ended Ellen Mussey's law practice carried out under her husband's name. She obtained special consideration and was allowed to qualify for the bar by oral examination, which she passed in March, 1893. In 1896, Ellen Spencer Mussey was admitted to practice before the Supreme Court of the United States.

== Career ==
She was approached in 1895 by Delia Sheldon Jackson, an aspiring attorney, to apprentice her as a student of law. Realizing both the scope of the task and the significance of the opportunity, Mussey sought out the assistance of a colleague and friend, Emma Gillett. The two opened the first session of the Woman's Law Class on February 1, 1896. The class had an enrollment of three: Jackson and two other women, Nanette Paul and Helen Malcolm.

Within a few years, the program had expanded and several prominent Washington, D.C., attorneys were brought in for assistance. Although Mussey and Gillett had not initially aspired to establish an independent law school, when Columbian College refused their request to take on the women they had educated for their final year of education—-on grounds that "women did not have the mentality for law"—they decided to establish a co-educational law school specifically open to women.

Thus, in April 1898, the Washington College of Law (now merged with American University) was incorporated in Washington, D.C., as the first law school in the world founded by women. Mussey served as the first dean of the college until her retirement in 1913.

With Emma Gillett, Mussey founded the Women's Bar Association of the District of Columbia on May 19, 1917, and was elected its first President. The WBA was one of the first organizations for women lawyers in United States. In 1919, Mussey also helped to found the National Association of Women Lawyers. Mussey also served as the first chairwoman of the Women's City Club of Washington, D.C., which was founded in the same year.

Mussey died on April 21, 1936, in Washington, D.C.

== Bibliography ==
- Eicher, John H., and David J. Eicher, Civil War High Commands. Stanford: Stanford University Press, 2001. ISBN 0-8047-3641-3.
- Hunt, Roger D. and Jack R. Brown, Brevet Brigadier Generals in Blue. Gaithersburg, MD: Olde Soldier Books, Inc., 1990. ISBN 1-56013-002-4.
- Golemba, Beverly E., Lesser-Known Women: A Biographical Dictionary. Boulder, CO: Lynne Rienner Publishers, Inc., 1992 ISBN 1-55587-301-4.
- Poole, Susan Flagg (1999). "Chapter 10: The Heart of Service / Ellen Spencer Mussey (1850-1936)". Lost Legacy: Inspiring Women of Nineteenth-Century America. West Chester, Pennsylvania: Chrysalis Books. ISBN 978-0-87785-386-2.
