= American University Journal of Gender, Social Policy & the Law =

- Discipline: Law
- Language: English

Publication details
- Former names: American University Journal of Gender & the Law
- History: 1992–present
- Frequency: Quarterly

Standard abbreviations
- Bluebook: Am. U. J. Gender Soc. Pol'y & L.
- ISO 4: Am. Univ. J. Gend. Soc. Policy Law

Indexing
- ISSN: 1557-3753
- LCCN: 2007228588
- OCLC no.: 60648403

Links
- Journal homepage; Online archive

The American University Journal of Gender, Social Policy & the Law is a law review published by students at the American University Washington College of Law. The Washington & Lee University School of Law ranked the journal as the most cited legal periodical in the United States and selected non-U.S. regions in the topical area of gender, social policy, and the law in 2019. It was also ranked #1 in Race & Minority issues and #5 for Gender issues in 2019.

Additionally, the journal has been ranked as one of the top subject-specific law reviews in the "2006 ExpressO Law Review Submission Guide."

== History ==
The journal was established in 1992 at the Washington College of Law as the American University Journal of Gender & the Law. The name was changed in 1998 to expand the range of topics covered by the journal. In 2006, the journal was one of the top subject-specific law reviews in the "2006 ExpressO Law Review Submission Guide."

On October 8, 2019, the American Bar Association Commission on Disability Rights, American University Washington College of Law, and the journal cosponsored a symposium for disabled law students and recent graduates. In 2019, the Washington & Lee University School of Law ranked the journal as the most cited legal periodical in the United States and selected non-U.S. regions in the topical area of gender, social policy and the law. It was also ranked #1 in Race & Minority issues ad #5 for Gender issues in 2019.
