= Reuben D. Mussey Jr. =

American lawyer

- Born: May 30, 1833; Hanover, New Hampshire
- Died: May 29, 1892 (aged 58); Washington, D.C.
- Burial place: Oak Hill Cemetery
- Military career
- Allegiance: United States of America; Union
- Branch: (United States) Union Army
- Service years: 1861–1866
- Rank: Colonel
- Unit: 19th U.S. Infantry Regiment
- Commands: 100th U.S. Colored Troops
- Conflicts: American Civil War
- Other work: Lawyer, Journalist

Reuben D. Mussey Jr. (May 30, 1833 – May 29, 1892) was a Union Army colonel during the American Civil War and a distinguished lawyer. He was an important recruiter of black men into the United States Colored Troops. Between April 1865 and November 1865, Mussey was President Andrew Johnson's private secretary. Johnson nominated Mussey for appointment to the brevet grade of brigadier general of volunteers, but the U.S. Senate did not confirm the appointment. Mussey was the husband of Ellen Spencer Mussey who was also his law partner and became the head of the practice upon his death.

== Early life ==
Mussey was the son of the medical doctor Reuben D. Mussey and his wife Hettie Osgood. He was born in Hanover, New Hampshire, on May 30, 1833. Some sources list his name as Reuben Delevan Mussey, suggesting that Jr. may not be technically correct, but since both he and his father are referred to as Reuben D. Mussey or Reuben Mussey, the Jr. is the best way to distinguish the two.

After matriculating from Dummer Academy in Byfield, Massachusetts, and attending Phillips Academy at Andover, Massachusetts, RD Mussey graduated from Dartmouth College in 1854. After College, he began teaching and working in the press in Boston. In 1859, he was the Washington correspondent of the Cincinnati Gazette.

== Civil War ==
He campaigned for Abraham Lincoln in 1860 and was a leader in the Wide Awakes and at the outbreak of the Civil War joined a militia company led by abolitionist Cassius M. Clay which organized to guard the president and the White House. When the regular army was expanded in May 1861, he began serving in the regular army of the United States as captain of the 19th U.S. Infantry Regiment.

Mussey supported the anti-slavery movement and was in favor of the enlisting of black troops in the war. Mussey was a strong advocate of enlisting African-American soldiers and in correspondence with his superiors took issue with William T. Sherman's view on this issue. As a captain of the 19th U.S. Infantry Regiment from May 14, 1861, until June 14, 1864, Mussey helped recruit African-American soldiers for the Union Army, being detailed to act as a commissioner for organizing black troops with headquarters at Nashville. On June 14, 1864, Mussey was appointed colonel of the 100th U.S. Colored Infantry. However, he remained in Nashville rather than serving with the regiment, instead continuing his organizational duties.

== After the war ==
While in Nashville, he became connected with then governor and later President Andrew Johnson. Mussey served as President Johnson's private secretary from April 1865 to November 1865. At some date for which the record has not been found, Johnson nominated Mussey for appointment to the brevet grade of brigadier general in the regular army, to rank from March 13, 1865, but the U.S. Senate did not confirm the appointment.

Mussey was mustered out of the volunteers on December 26, 1865, and resigned from the regular army on February 19, 1866. Soon after this date, he began a law practice in Washington, D.C. He had two daughters with his first wife. It was after her death he met and latter married Ellen Spencer. Mussey also served as an adjunct professor of law at Howard University.

Reuben Delevan Mussey died in Washington, D.C., on May 29, 1892. He is buried in Oak Hill Cemetery (Washington, D.C.). Religiously, he was a member of The New Church

== Notes ==
On Page 270 of Medical Record, Volume 1, edited by George Frederick Shrady, Thomas Lathrop Stedman. This document reflects an obituary of the father of Brigadier-General Reuben D. Mussey and, it is on this document that satisfies the claim of Brigadier-General Reuben D. Mussey.
