= 100th Brigade =

100th Brigade may refer to:

== Germany ==
- 100th Brigade (Wehrmacht)
- 100th Panzer Brigade

== India ==
- 100th Indian Infantry Brigade

== Russia ==
- 100th Separate Guards Reconnaissance Brigade
- 100th Separate Guards Motorized Rifle Brigade, known as the 110th Brigade since 2023

== Soviet Union ==
- 100th Kazakh Rifle Brigade

== Ukraine ==
- 100th Mechanized Brigade

== United Kingdom ==
- 100th Anti-Aircraft Brigade
- 100th Brigade (United Kingdom)
- 100th Brigade, Royal Field Artillery, a British Army unit during World War I
- 100th (Worcestershire and Oxfordshire Yeomanry) Brigade, Royal Field Artillery, a British Army unit after World War I

== United States ==
- 100th Missile Defense Brigade

== See also ==
- 100th Division (disambiguation)
- 100th Regiment (disambiguation)
