= 100 points =

100 points is a term that holds differing significance in various sports. The following are some of the distinctions this phrase may refer to:

- List of basketball players who have scored 100 points in a single game, a rare achievement
  - Wilt Chamberlain's 100-point game, the only occurrence of a 100-point game in the National Basketball Association (NBA)
- List of 100-point games in college football, American college football
- List of NHL players with 100-point seasons, National Hockey League (NHL)
- Century break, scoring 100 points or more within one turn in the game of snooker

== Other uses ==
- 100 point check, an outcome of the Australian Commonwealth Government's desire to limit opportunities for individuals and companies to hide financial transaction fraud
- U+1F4AF 💯 HUNDRED POINTS SYMBOL, representing the perfect score in academic grading in Japan that ranges from 0 to 100
