= 100th Regiment of Foot =

100th Regiment of Foot may refer to:

- 100th Regiment of Foot (1760), raised in 1760
- 100th Regiment of Foot (Loyal Lincolnshire Regiment), raised in 1780
- 92nd (Gordon Highlanders) Regiment of Foot, raised as the 100th (Gordon Highlanders) in 1794 and renumbered as the 92nd in 1798
- 100th Regiment of Foot (Prince Regent's County of Dublin Regiment), raised in 1804 and renumbered as the 99th in 1816
- New South Wales Corps, renumbered from the 102nd in 1816
- 100th (Prince of Wales's Royal Canadian) Regiment of Foot, raised in 1858
