= Ira P. Robbins =

American criminal law professor

- Occupation: Professor

Academic background
- Education: University of Pennsylvania (AB); Harvard Law School (JD)

Academic work
- Discipline: Legal scholar
- Institutions: University of Kansas School of Law (1975–1979); American University Washington College of Law (since 1979)
- Main interests: Criminal law, First Amendment, capital punishment, habeas corpus, prisoners’ rights

Ira P. Robbins is Distinguished Professor of Law and Barnard T. Welsh Scholar at American University Washington College of Law, where he specializes in criminal law.

== Early life and education ==
Robbins attended The University of Pennsylvania, where he received an A.B. degree. Robbins later graduated from Harvard Law School, receiving a juris doctor.

== Career ==
Robbins served as a Supreme Court Fellow from 1985 to 1986, training federal judges on habeas corpus and supporting the Federal Judicial Center.

Robbins has been a professor of law at the American University Washington College of Law since 1979. Robbins is a member of the New York and District of Columbia Bars. Since 1982, Robbins has been the director of the university's J.D./M.S. Joint Degree Program in Justice, Law and Society. Since 2013, he has been a co-founder and co-director of the Criminal Justice Practice and Policy Institute. Robbins has received many awards at the university due to his teaching and scholarship. At the Washington College of law, Robbins received the University Faculty Award for Outstanding Teaching in 1985, and in 1988 received the award for Scholar/Teacher of the Year, which is American University's highest faculty award. In 2010, he won the Pauline Ruyle Moore Award, recognizing his scholarly work in the field of public law. In 2011, Robbins was the first recipient of the Washington College of Law Award for Exemplary Teaching. In 2015, Robbins received the Washington College of Law Award for Outstanding Service.

Robbins is a longtime advocate of prisoners' rights, and he has written books and many law review articles about criminal law and prisons. He has advocated for prison reform and for emergency planning in prisons. Robbins opposes private prisons, and in 2016, was elected to the Board of Directors of Abolish Private Prisons.

After the 2016 United States presidential election, Robbins signed a letter alongside other faculty members at American University asking students and members of the community to condemn discrimination. In 2018, Robbins was one of more than 2,400 law professors signing a letter to the United States Senate, asking them not to confirm Supreme Court Justice Brett Kavanaugh. In February 2020, Robbins signed a letter submitted to Congress as part of the first impeachment of Donald Trump. Robbins has also contributed to SCOTUSblog.

Robbins is known for his studies regarding the First Amendment, and has been quoted in many articles and cases discussing the use of the middle finger and freedom of expression. He has stated that, while giving a police officer the finger is "not the smartest thing to do," it is not illegal and a conviction for the gesture would likely not be upheld on appeal. In 2008, Robbins wrote an 83-page article titled Digitus Impudicus: The Middle Finger and the Law, which discusses the use of the gesture and its relation to the law. Robbins was also featured discussing the gesture in a comedic video for The Colbert Report.

== Selected publications ==
=== Books ===
- Prisoners and the Law (Thomson/Reuters, seven vols., 2026).
- Habeas Corpus Checklists (Thomson/Reuters, two vols., 2027).
- Toward a More Just and Effective System of Review in State Death Penalty Cases (American Bar Association, 1990).
- The Legal Dimensions of Private Incarceration (American Bar Association, 1988).
- The Law and Processes of Postconviction Remedies: Cases and Materials (West Publishing Company, 1982).
- Prisoners Rights Sourcebook: Theory, Litigation, Practice (Clark Boardman Company, Ltd., 1980).
- Comparative Postconviction Remedies (D.C. Heath/Lexington Books, 1980).

=== Articles ===
- Against an AI Privilege, Harvard Journal of Law & Technology Digest (Nov. 2025).
- Criminal Abortion and Citizen's Arrest, 2025 Utah Law Review 281.
- Deconstructing Burglary, 57 U.C. Davis Law Review 1489 (2024).
- Citizen’s Arrest and Race, 20 Ohio State Journal of Criminal Law 133 (2022).
- Sunshine Laws Behind the Clouds: Limited Transparency in a Time of National Emergency, 56 U.C. Davis Law Review 1 (2022).
- The Obsolescence of Blue Laws in the 21st Century, 33 Stanford Law & Policy Review 289 (2022).
- Explaining Florida Man, 49 Florida State University Law Review 1 (2021).
- Sham Subpoenas and Prosecutorial Ethics, 58 American Criminal Law Review 1 (2021).
- Perjury by Omission, 97 Washington University Law Review 265 (2019).
- Guns N’ Ganja: How Federalism Criminalizes the Lawful Use of Marijuana, 51 U.C. Davis Law Review 1783 (2018).
- “And/Or” and the Proper Use of Legal Language, 77 Maryland Law Review 311 (2018)
- Regulating Gun Rentals, 64 UCLA Law Review 414 (2017).
- Vilifying the Vigilante: A Narrowed Scope of Citizen’s Arrest, 25 Cornell Journal of Law and Public Policy 557 (2016).
- Last Words: A Survey and Analysis of Federal Judges’ Views on Allocution in Sentencing, 65 Alabama Law Review 735 (2014) (with U.S. District Judge Mark W. Bennett).
- Digitus Impudicus: The Middle Finger and the Law, 41 U.C. DAVIS LAW REVIEW 1403 (2008).
- Semiotics, Analogical Legal Reasoning, and the Cf. Citation: Getting Our Signals Uncrossed, 48 Duke Law Journal 1043 (1999).
- George Bush’s America Meets Dante’s Inferno: The Americans with Disabilities Act in Prison, 15 Yale Law & Policy Review 49 (1996).
- The Ostrich Instruction: Deliberate Ignorance as a Criminal Mens Rea, 81 Journal of Criminal Law and Criminology 191 (1990).
- Double Inchoate Crimes, 26 Harvard Journal on Legislation 1 (1989).
- Interjurisdictional Certification and Choice of Law, 41 Vanderbilt Law Review 411 (1988) (with John B. Corr).
- Attempting the Impossible: The Emerging Consensus, 23 Harvard Journal on Legislation 377 (1986).
- Legal Aspects of Prison Riots, 16 Harvard Civil Rights-Civil Liberties Law Review 735 (1982).
- Review of J. Gorecki, A Theory of Criminal Justice, 84 Harvard Law Review 918 (1981).
- Beyond Freedom and Dignity: Aleksandr Solzhenitsyn and the American Gulag, 78 Michigan Law Review 763 (1980).
- Punitive Conditions of Prison Confinement: An Analysis of Pugh v. Locke and Federal Court Supervision of State Penal Administration Under the Eighth Amendment, 29 Stanford Law Review 893 (1977) (with Michael Buser).

== Personal life ==
Robbins enjoys photography, and enters his photographs into competitions, such as the International Lawyer's Photography Competition.

== Awards ==
- Chief Judge John R. Brown Award for Judicial Scholarship and Education (1998).
- Elected Life Member of the American Law Institute (2007).
