= Hundred (disambiguation) =

A hundred is the natural number following 99 and preceding 101.

Hundred or hundreds may also refer to:

== Units and divisions ==
- Hundred (word) formerly also equal to 120 or other values
- Hundred (unit) sometimes equal to 120 or other values
  - Hundredweight (cwt.), the most common of these units
- Hundred (county division), a largely historical division of a county or similar larger administrative unit.

== Places ==
- Hundred, West Virginia, US
- One Hundred Above the Park, a residential high-rise in St. Louis, Missouri, United States

== Arts, entertainment, media ==
- Hundred (novel series), a Japanese light novel series
- Hundreds (video game), a 2013 puzzle video game
- "Hundred", a song by the Fray from How to Save a Life
- "Hundred", a song by Khalid from Free Spirit
- "Hundred", an episode of the TV series One Tree Hill
- Hundred (TV series), an Indian series by Hotstar

== Other uses ==
- The Hundred (cricket), a professional 100-ball cricket tournament in the UK, from summer 2021
- The Hundreds, a U.S. streetwear brand
- The Hundred with Andy Lee, an Australian television show

== See also ==
- The 100 (disambiguation), including "The Hundred"
- 100 (disambiguation)
