= Golden psalter =

Golden psalter may refer to:

- Golden Psalter of Charlemagne, also called the Dagulf Psalter
- Golden Psalter of Saint Gall
