= Ada Gospels =

Eighth or ninth century Carolingian gospel book

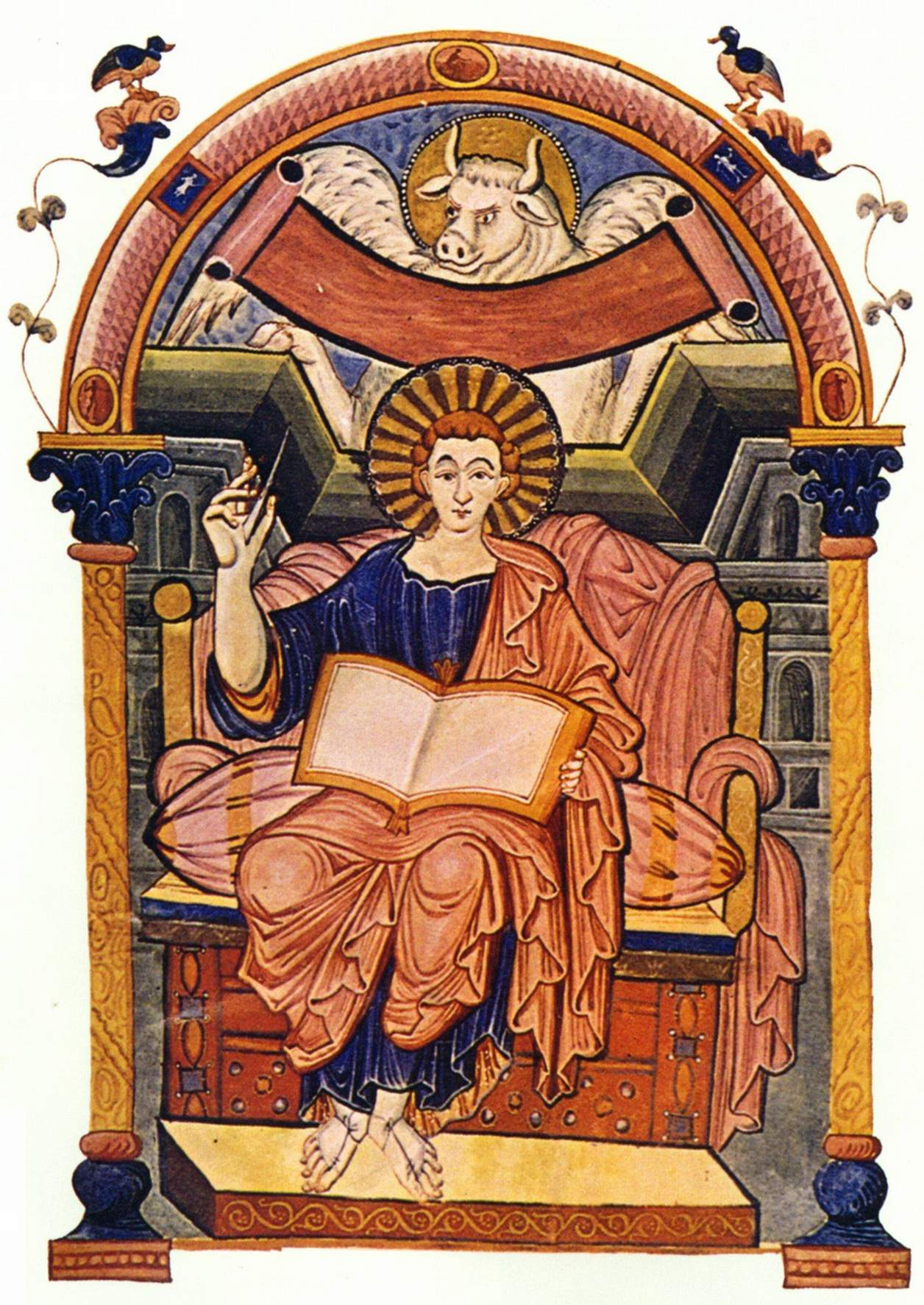
Folio 85v of the Ada Gospels contains the evangelist portrait of Luke

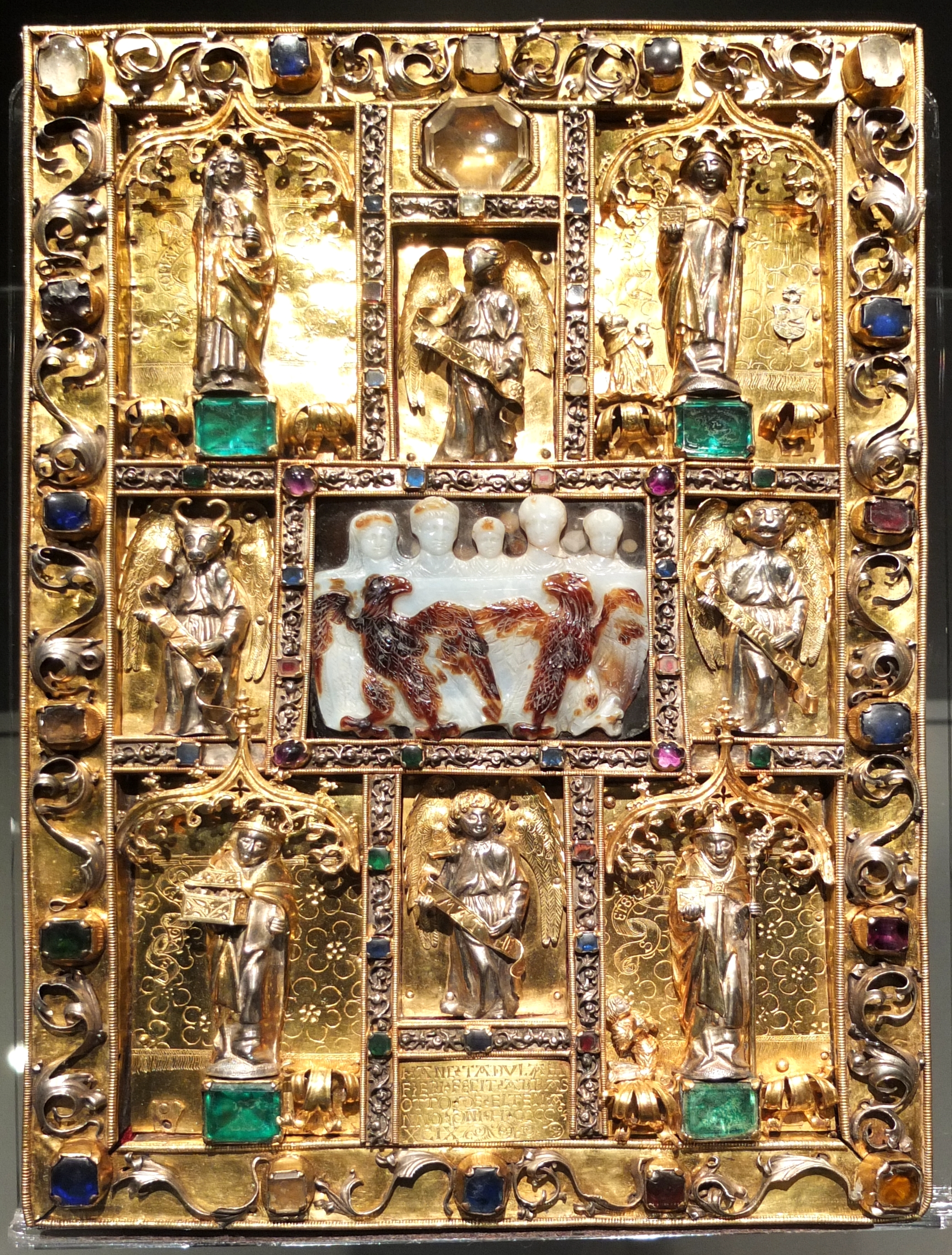
The 1499 gold binding

The Ada Gospels (Trier, Stadtbibliothek, Codex 22) is a late eighth-century or early ninth-century Carolingian gospel book in the Stadtbibliothek, Trier, Germany. The manuscript contains a dedication to Charlemagne's sister Ada, from where it gets its name. The manuscript is written on vellum in Carolingian minuscule. It measures 14.5 by 9.625 inches (36.8 by 24.5 cm). The Ada Gospels are one of a group of manuscript illuminations by a circle of scriptoria that represent what modern scholars call the "Ada School". Other products of the Ada School include the Soissons Gospels, Harley Golden Gospels, Godescalc Evangelistary and the Lorsch Gospels; ten manuscripts in total are usually recognised.

The manuscript is illuminated. Its illuminations include an elaborate initial page for the Gospel of Matthew and portraits of Matthew, Mark and Luke. The illuminations show Insular, Italian and Byzantine influences. The Evangelist portraits show a firm grasp of Classical style typical of the Carolingian Renaissance.

In 1499 the codex was given a rich sculpted gold binding that includes the Late Antique Eagle Cameo displaying the family of Emperor Constantine.
