= Coronation Gospels (British Library, Cotton MS Tiberius A.ii) =

Ottonian illuminated Gospel book

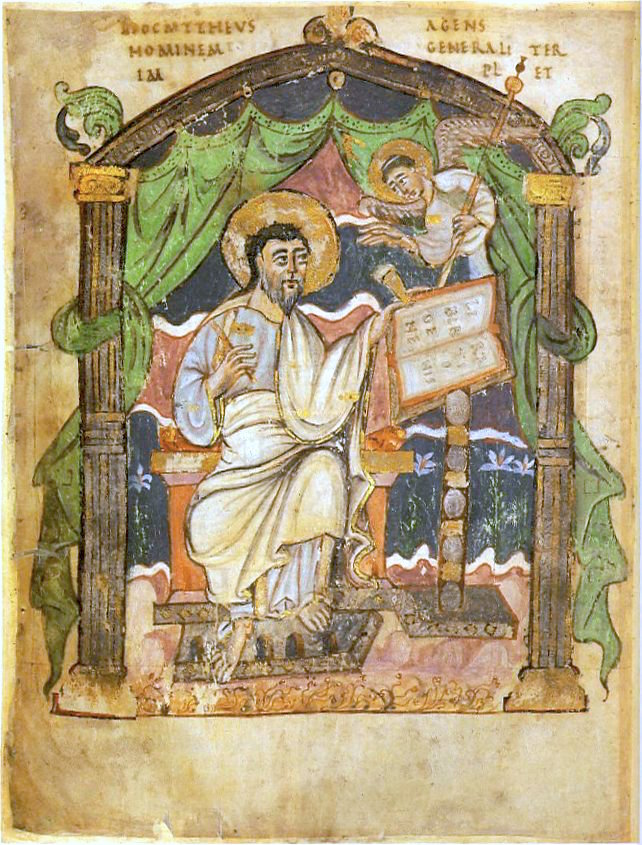
Folio 24 recto. Evangelist portrait of Saint Matthew

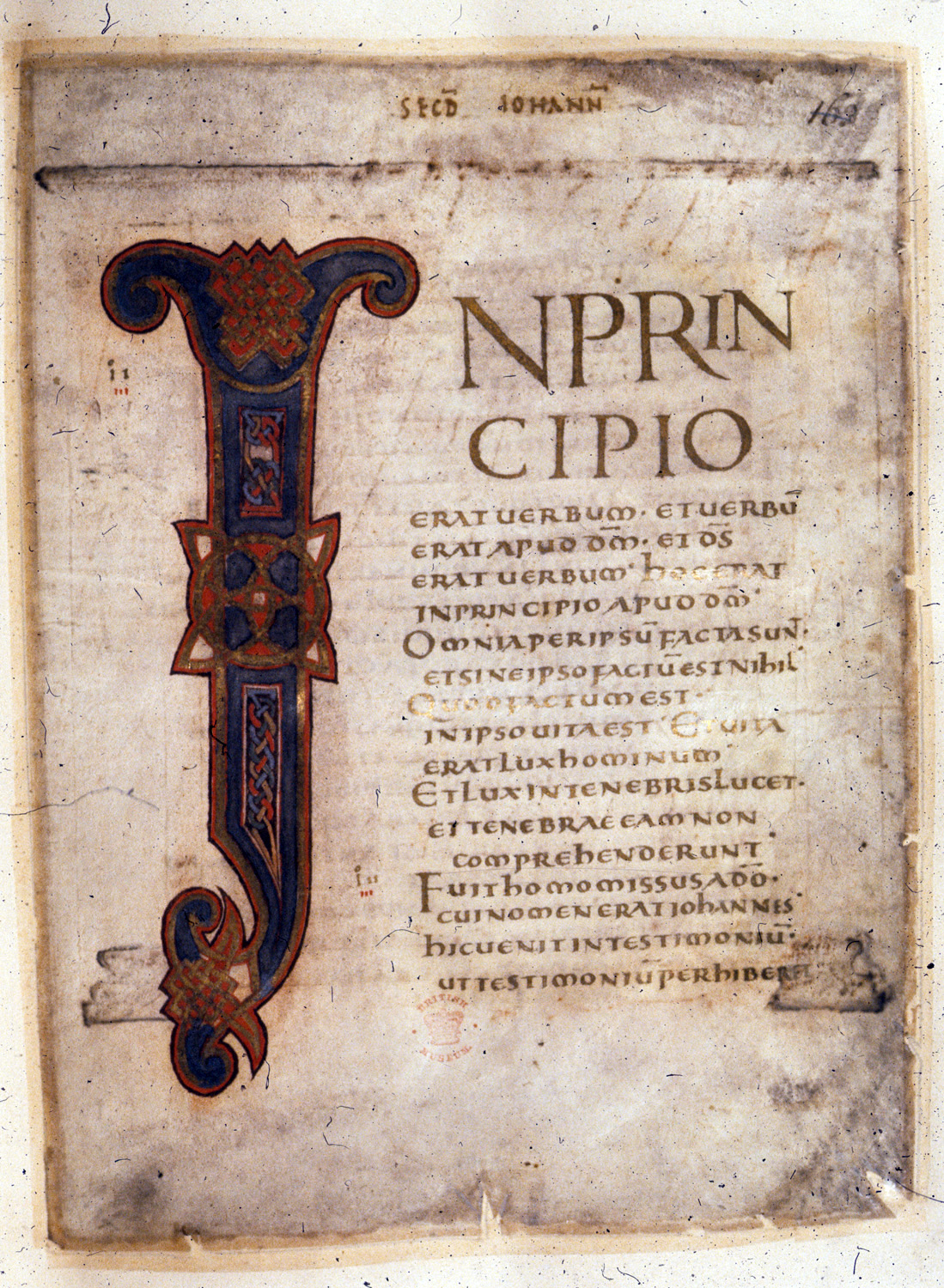
Folio 162 recto, the start of the Gospel of John

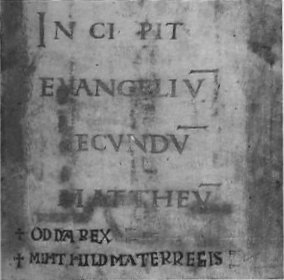
Folio 24 verso, showing the names of Otto the Great and his mother Matilda

The Athelstan Gospels, or British Library, Cotton MS Tiberius A. ii is a late 9th or early 10th-century Ottonian illuminated Gospel book which entered England as a gift to King Athelstan, who in turn offered it to Christ Church, Canterbury. It is also referred to as the Coronation Gospels (as are other manuscripts) on account of an early modern tradition that it had been used as an oath-book at English coronations.

The page size is 235 x 180mm. The manuscript "is a concrete example of the type of Continental illuminated manuscript, imported into England in the early tenth century, which was available to the artists who laid the foundations of the Winchester school" of illumination. The manuscript was divided by Sir Robert Cotton when it was in his Cotton Library, who removed Papal bulls and Anglo-Saxon charters from the end of the book.

== Early history ==
The Gospel book was probably written on the Continent, possibly at Lobbes Abbey (Belgium), in the late 9th or early 10th century. A few inscriptions entered into the manuscript reveal something of its subsequent history.

It was presented by King Athelstan to Christ Church Priory, Canterbury, in the early 10th century, as a lengthy inscription on f. 15v records. The language and style of the inscription recall some of the king's charters and as in some of these charters, Athelstan is styled "ruler of the English [Anglorum basyleos] and ruler of the whole of Britain [curagulus totius Bryttanie]", associating the king with "an imperial past and the glories of the heirs of Rome".

Athelstan, in turn, may have received the book from his brother-in-law Otto the Great, who was king of Germany, and Otto's mother, Matilda (d. 968). Their names (odda rex and mihtild mater regis) are written, probably by an Englishman, on the back of the picture of Saint Matthew (f. 24r), here shown to the right. A third inscription, which occurs now on f. 15r but may originally have come before f. 3r, presents the Latin poem Rex pius Æðelstan ("Devout King Athelstan"), written by a continental scribe in Caroline minuscule.

In the middle of the 10th century, the manuscript's portrait of St Matthew served as an exemplar for an Anglo-Saxon artist, who copied it into a manuscript which is classified today as Oxford, St John's College, MS 194.

During the 11th and 12th century, blank spaces in the manuscript were used to record a number of texts in Old English and Latin bearing on the properties of Christ Church, Canterbury. According to Neil Ker, the documents covered 11 blank leaves which Robert Cotton (d. 1631) removed from the manuscript in order to rebind them in two manuscripts, Cotton MS Claudius A. iii (ff. 2–7, 9) and MS Faustina B. vi (ff. 95, 98-100).

== Robert Cotton ==
In the early 17th century, the manuscript was acquired by Sir Robert Cotton, who reused a late medieval manuscript leaf to add a title page (f. 1r) with a gold-lettered Latin poem written on it. Written as though uttered by the book itself, the poem was probably specially composed for the title page and possibly by Cotton himself. It puts forward the spurious claim that Athelstan had intended the gospel book to be "sacred to kings, whenever they were contemplating the initial responsibilities of rule", apparently since Cotton assumed that kings were to swear their coronation oaths on it. A letter of his time reveals that in 1626 Cotton had presented the book to Charles I precisely for such purposes. Although it seems that Cotton's hopes were not fulfilled, it is possible that the manuscript had served its imagined purpose at the coronation of James II in 1685.
