= Wilhelm Koehler =

German art historian

Wilhelm Reinhold Walter Koehler (Köhler until 1932) (17 December 1884 – 3 November 1959) was a German art historian. He was a professor at the University of Jena from 1924, but moved to Harvard University in 1932 as a result of clashes with the Nazi government. Named to the William Dorr Boardman Professor of Fine Arts in 1950, he retired in 1953.
