= Coronation Gospels =

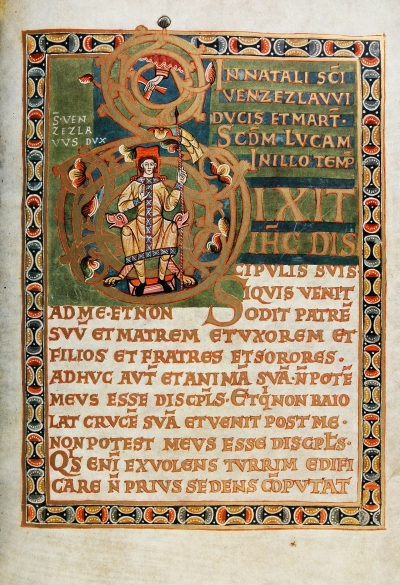
The new Bohemian monarchy uses the crowning haloed Hand of God in the Coronation Gospels of Vratislav II.

A number of medieval illuminated manuscript Gospel books are called the Coronation Gospels, meaning they have, at least by tradition, had a coronation oath sworn upon them at some point.

The plain term is mainly used of the 8th century Vienna Coronation Gospels, traditionally used for crowning the Holy Roman Emperors and their Austrian successors, but also the Coronation Gospels (British Library, Cotton MS Tiberius A.ii), in England since the 10th century. There is also the 11th century Czech Codex Vyssegradensis, also called the "Coronation Gospels of Vratislav II", commissioned after the event to commemorate the coronation of the first King of Bohemia.
