= Second Bible of Charles the Bald =

9th-century illuminated manuscript

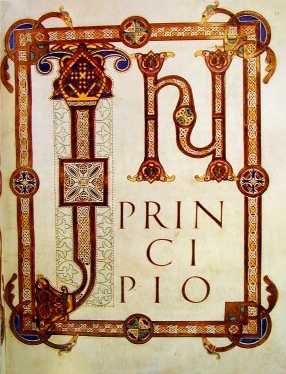
Genesis 1:1

The Second Bible of Charles the Bald is a 9th-century illuminated manuscript made in St. Amand's Abbey. It contains no miniatures though has many initials. The initials are made in a Franco-insular style.

== Codicological description ==
The book contains 444 parchment folios. The page size is 430 by 335 mm (16.9 by 13.2 in) and divided into 2 columns of 52 lines per page written in Latin. The manuscript is decorated with 74 large, painted initials with the incipits of the various chapters written in golden uncials or capitals. At the top of the pages, the chapter titles are shown in red. The text is written in Carolingian minuscule script. The beginning of the Bible is decorated with full-page initials resembling the incipit of the Book of Genesis.

== Contents ==
The text is from the Vulgate Bible. It is the full text of both the New and Old Testament, with a small dedication poem from Hucbald at the beginning about Charles the Bald.
