= Petershausen Sacramentary =

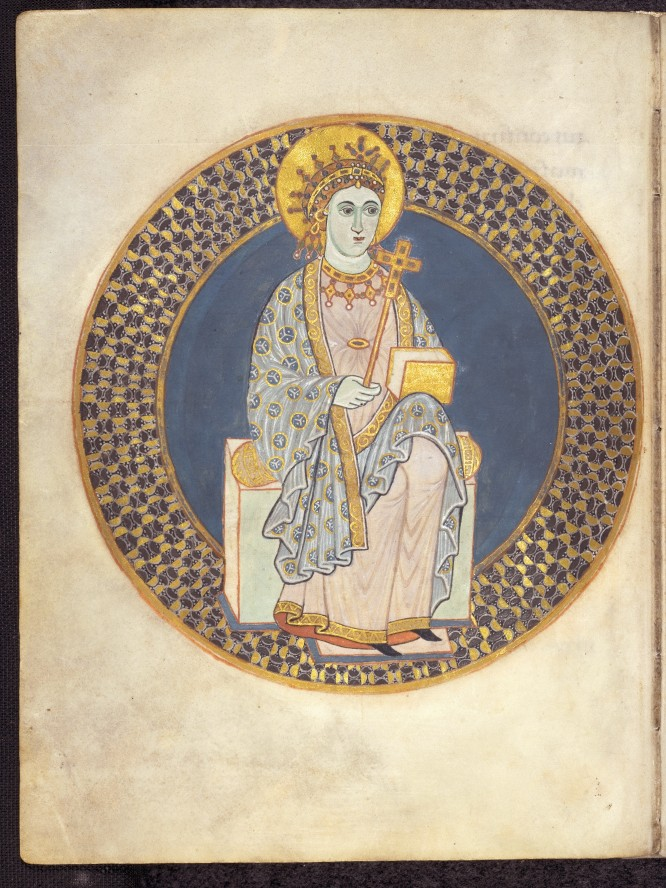
The unusual "Mary-Ecclesia" depiction (folio 40, verso)

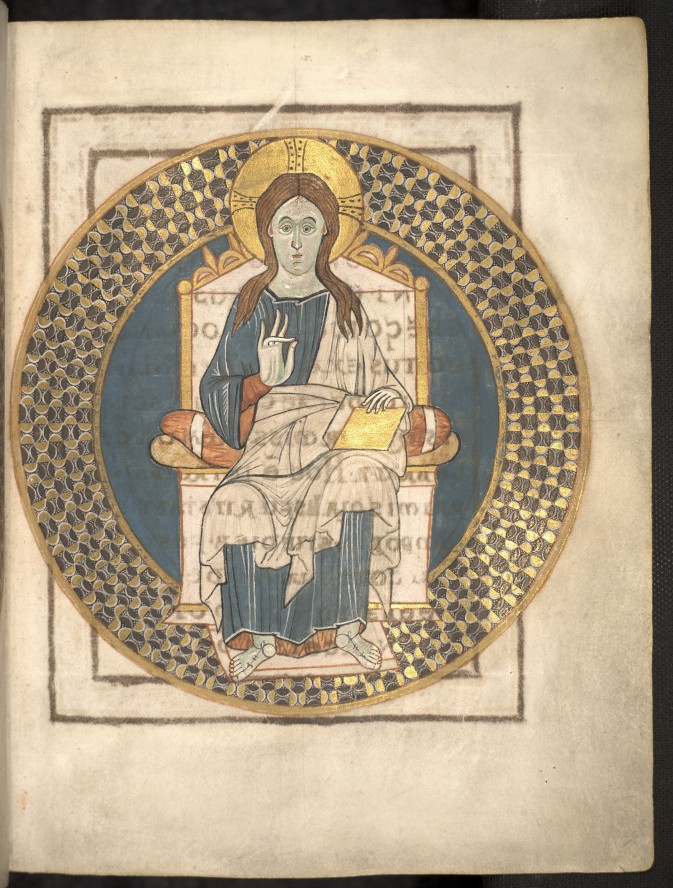
Christ Enthroned (Heidelberg University Library, Cod. Sal. IXb, Fol. 41r

The Petershausen Sacramentary is an Ottonian illuminated manuscript of around 960–980, produced in the scriptorium of Reichenau Abbey and containing the sacramentary and liturgical calendar. It is now held in the Heidelberg University library.

The miniature on folio 40 originally opened the manuscript and has been the subject of much debate. It displays attributes of the Virgin Mary and Ecclesia (personifications of the church), but differs from usual representations of either. Her regalia does not follow Northern iconography, being closer to Roman depictions of the Maria Regina. Her necklace and earrings recall the prependoulia of Byzantine crowns, while her patterned tunic and mantle give the appearance of Byzantine silks. Consistent with earlier depictions of Byzantine empresses, Anton von Euw interpreted the image as an "Imperial Virgin" and suggested it may have been inspired by Theophanu, the Byzantine princess who married Otto II.

== Bibliography ==
- Collins, Kristen M. (2007). Visualizing Mary: Innovation and Exegesis in Ottonian Manuscript Illumination. ISBN 978-0-549-34899-3.
- (in German) Florentine Mütherich, « Sakramentar aus Petershausen », Suevia Sacra. Frühe Kunst in Schwaben, Augsburg 1973, S. 172 Nr. 161 Abb. 150.
- (in German) Ludwig Schuba, « Reichenauer Texttradition im Petershausener Sakramentar ». In: Bibliothek und Wissenschaft Bd. 12, 1978, p. 115–140.
- (in German) Anton von Euw, « Sakramentar aus Petershausen ». In: Vor dem Jahr 1000. Abendländische Buchkunst zur Zeit der Kaiserin Theophanu. Schnütgen-Museum, Köln 1991, S. 122ff. Nr. 32.
- https://diglit.ub.uni-heidelberg.de/diglit/sal9b/
