= Dagulf Psalter =

Carolingian manuscript

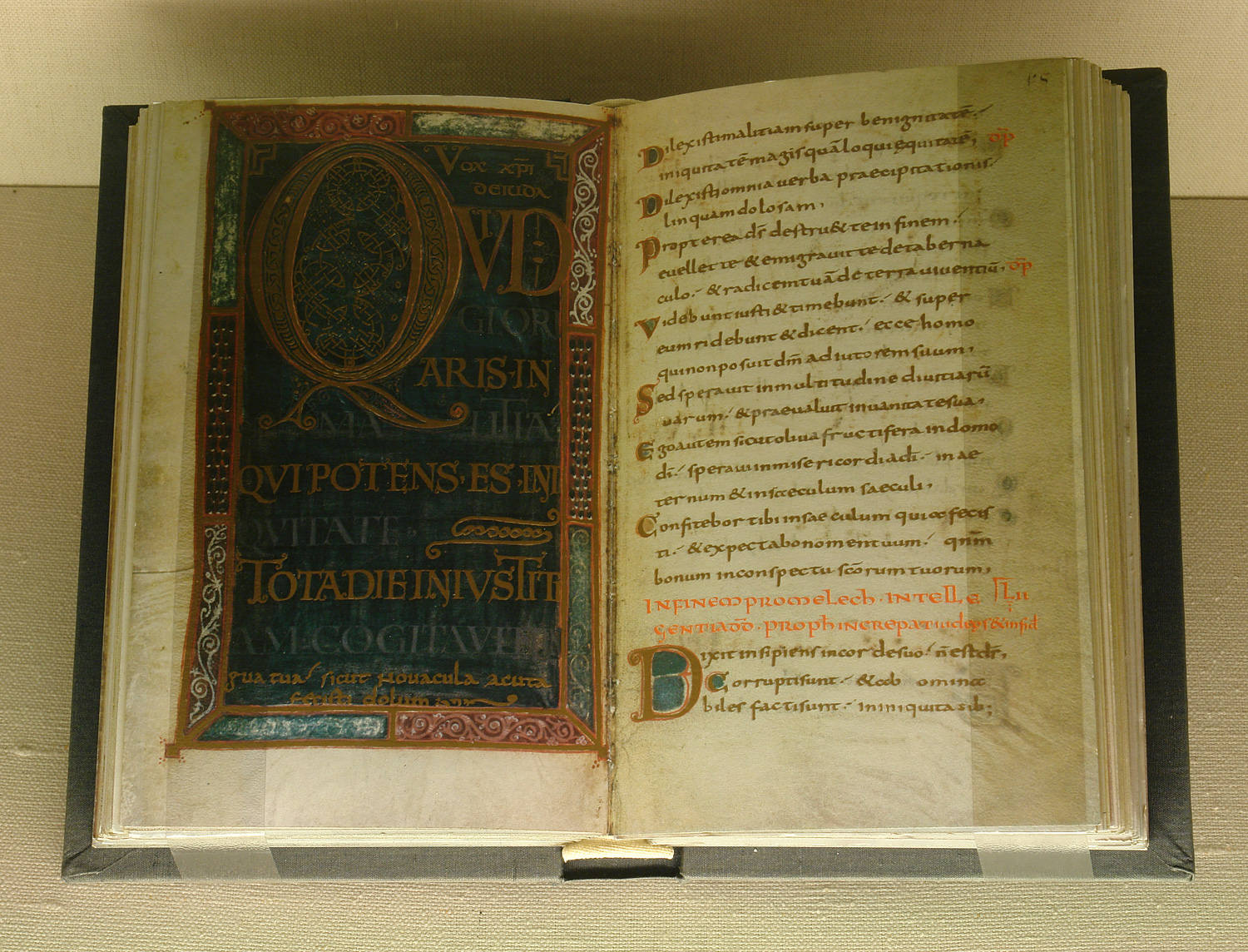
Facsimile of the Dagulf Psalter showing painted initial folio (left), and golden script (right).

The Dagulf Psalter is a late 8th-century Carolingian manuscript, and is one of the earliest examples of a codex emanating from the Court School of Charlemagne. The 161 page codex is written entirely in golden Carolingian minuscule script, and contains the Old Testament Psalms as well as a selection of Frankish Canticles. The Psalter is believed to have been created by the scribe Dagulf in 793–795 CE as a gift from Charlemagne to Pope Adrian I.

== History ==
The Psalter's creation is thought to be an attempt by Charlemagne to repair his friendship with Pope Adrian I following the controversy surrounding his publication of the Libri Carolini.

By the end of the 8th century the close relationship between Charlemagne and Pope Adrian I was well documented. A devout Catholic, Charlemagne had aided the beleaguered pope by conquering the invading Lombard kingdom in 773, with the Frankish king maintaining close ties to the papacy thereafter. However, Charlemagne found himself embarrassingly aloof following misinterpretations of the Second Council of Nicaea and subsequent publication of the Libri Carolini. The books’ positions were lengthily refuted by Adrian, and it is believed that in this context Charlemagne commissioned the Dagulf Psalter.

Adrian's death in 795 meant that this Psalter likely never made its intended journey to Rome, and is believed to have remained in Carolingian possession at an unspecified location for much of the 9th and 10th centuries. The manuscript reappeared as "psalter written in gold letters" in an 11th-century accounting of objects moved from Limburg Abbey to the imperial church at Speyer, where it was subsequently moved to the imperial cathedral treasury in Bremen. The psalter remained in the imperial treasury until the mid-17th century when it was introduced to the private library of the Habsburg Leopold I, Holy Roman Emperor before he donated it to the imperial public library in 1666.

The manuscript’s folios remain at the Austrian National Library in Vienna, while the book's ivory plates were removed and put on display at the Louvre.

== Design ==
=== Codex ===
The Psalter's 161 folios are 19.2 x 12 cm sheets of parchment, and are lavishly ornamented in golden Carolingian script throughout. The book begins with a pair of dedicatory poems addressed to Pope Adrian I, with the scribe, Dagulf, identifying themself as the creator in the second. Dagulf's complete inscription to Adrian, translated from the original Latin:

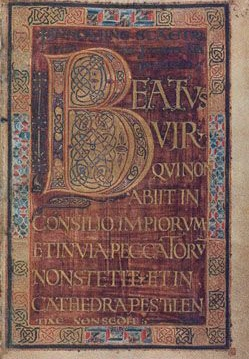
The Psalter's "Beatus" folio

"The golden letters paint David’s songs:
It is fitting to ornament such sweet songs so well.
The golden words sound, golden reigns bring them forth.
And they sing of a great good that will last forever.
Justifiably, they are decorated in a refined manner by ivory tablets,
which a gifted hand has carved marvelously.
There are the first origins of the psalter shown,
and the king who speaks in wise words himself sings in the choir.
Later the earlier beauty returned, the thorns having been withdrawn
by the enthusiasm of the man who kept vigil through the night.
You golden progeny, brighter than yellow gold,
Charles, our light, the highest love of the people.
Pious king, wise leader, marked with virtue and arms,
For whom all becoming things are fitting, whatever on earth becomes you,
Take the work of your humble servant Dagulf
Graciously, read it indulgently and with learned mouth.
In this way may your scepter be decorated with many triumphs,
And may you be associated at last with David’s choir."

It also contains three blue and purple pigmented initial leaves whose ornamental frames feature imitation gemstone paintings and interlace motifs. The psalter's Old Testament Psalms and Canticles are written twenty-three lines per page in golden script, and is devoid of any portraits, illuminations, or images that would later typify Carolingian manuscripts.

=== Ivory Covers ===
Two ivory tablets, which according to Dagulf, "a gifted hand has carved marvelously", serve as the book's cover. The carved ivory reliefs show the creation of the Old Testament psalms by King David, as well as their 4th-century translation to Latin by St. Jerome. Various figures appear in the corners of the frames, believed to be apostles, while the paschal lamb and hand of God appear at the center of the front and back covers respectively.

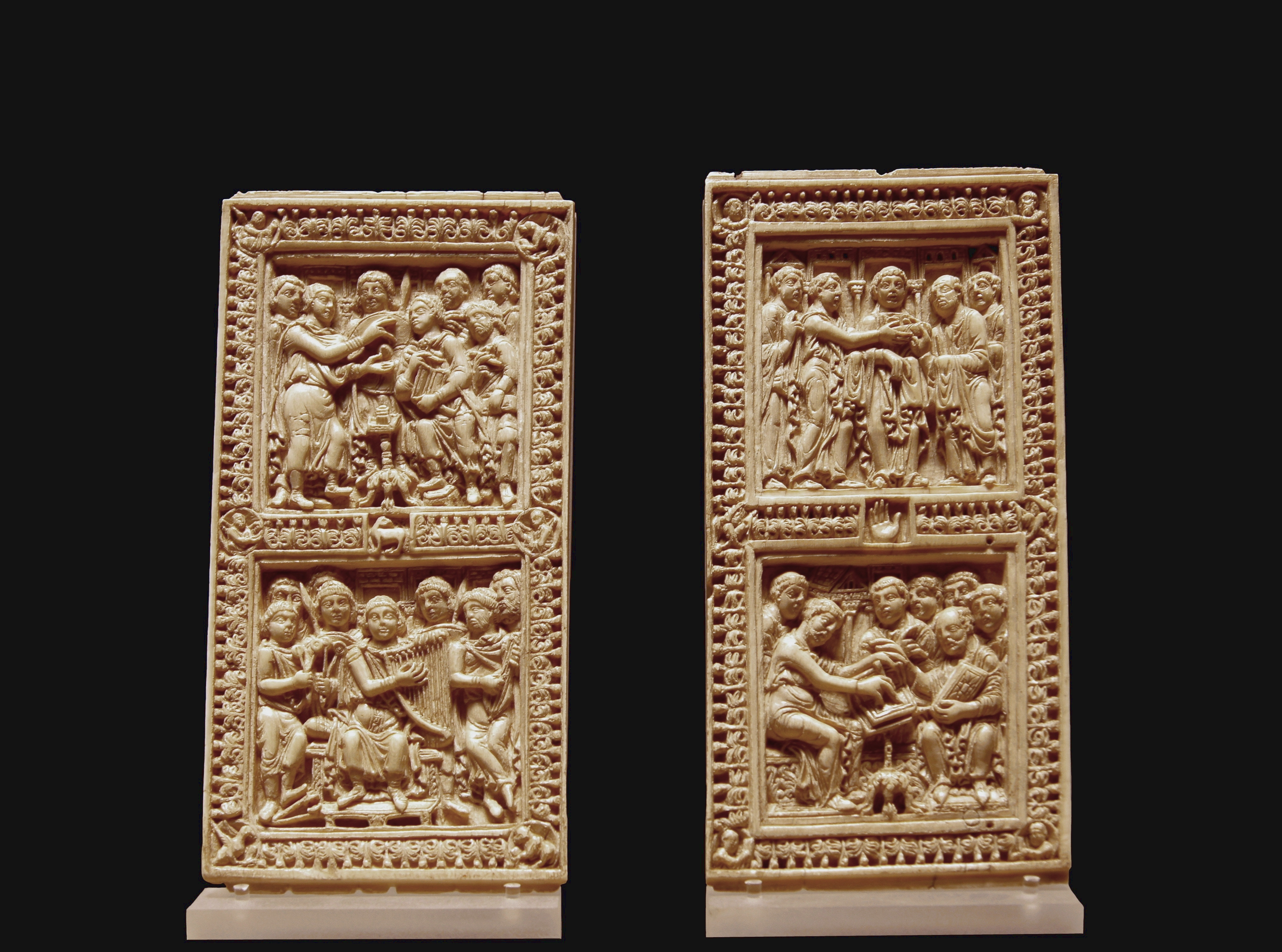
The Psalter's original ivory covers, now separated from the codex and on display in the Louvre.

The front cover's upper register depicts David selecting men to record the Psalms, who surround the king while holding various writing utensils. The lower register features David singing the Psalms while flanked by a group of musicians. On the reverse cover, Boniface delivers the orders of Pope Damasus to St. Jerome, imploring him to create a Latin translation of David's Psalms, with the lower register showing Jerome dictating his completed translations to a scribe. These depictions are thought to depict the narrative history of the psalter itself, as the images depict the Psalms process from spoken word, to song, and finally script.
