= Gospels of Saint-Médard de Soissons =

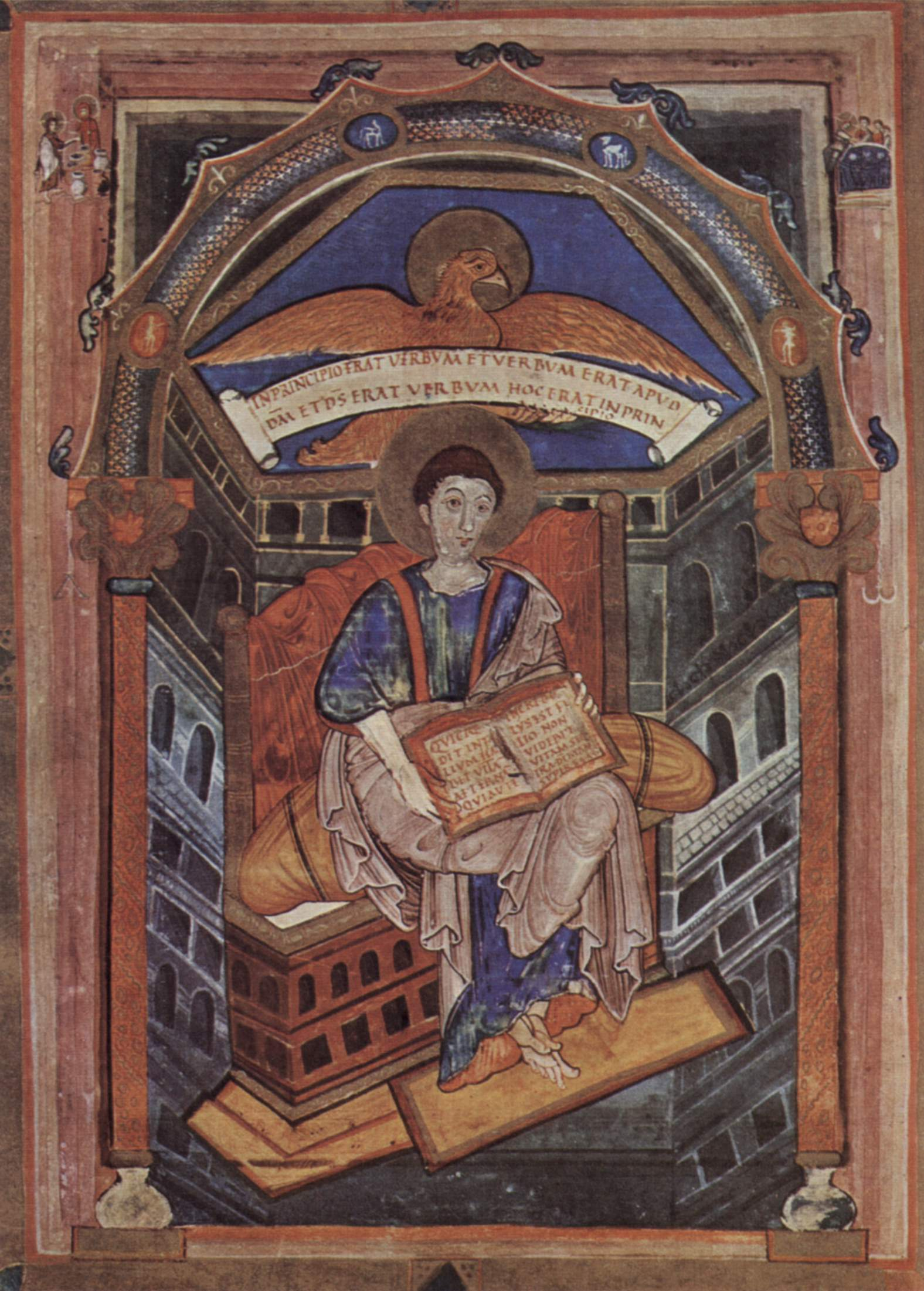
Portrait of John the Evangelist from Gospels of St. Medard de Soissons.

The Gospels of Saint-Médard de Soissons (Paris, Bibliothèque Nationale, MS lat. 8850) is a 9th-century illuminated manuscript gospel book, and is a product of the Court or Ada School of the Carolingian Renaissance.

The codex was produced before 827 when it was given to the abbey of Saint-Médard de Soissons by Louis the Pious and his wife, Judith. It remained in Soissons, France until the time of the French Revolution. The book contains the Vulgate text of the four gospels, Eusebian canon tables, and other prefatory texts. The 239 surviving folios measure 362 by 267 millimeters. The twelve pages of the canon tables are decorated, in addition there are six full page miniatures and four decorative pages. The full page miniatures include a representation of the Fountain of Life based on the similar illumination in the Godescalc Evangelistary.
