= Ebbo Gospels =

Early Carolingian illuminated Gospel book

St. Mark's illustration
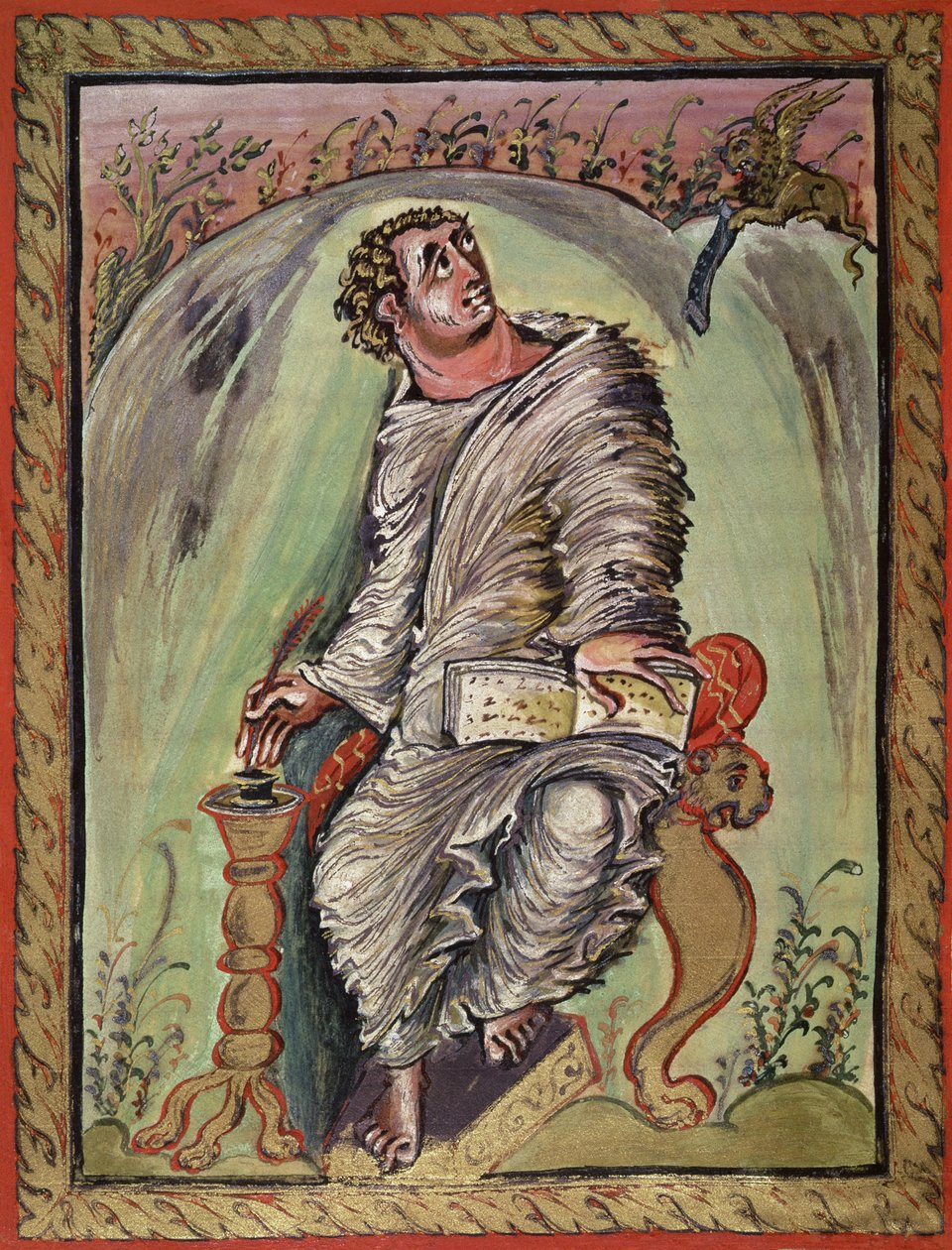
- St. Mark's illustration from the Ebbo Gospels
- Year: c. 816-35
- Owner: Municipal Library (Epernay, France)

The Ebbo Gospels is an early Carolingian illuminated Gospel book known for its expressionistic, agitated illustrations. The book was produced in the ninth century at the Benedictine Abbaye Saint-Pierre d’Hautvillers, and was named for Ebbo, the archbishop of Reims at the time of the creation of the manuscript. The manuscript contains the four Gospels by Saint Mark, Saint Luke, Saint John, and Saint Matthew. The evangelists illustrations are characterized by an anti-classical emotionalism, which can be observed in other Carolingian manuscripts such as the Utrecht Psalter and the Codex Aureus of St. Emmeram and espresses a Christian conception of God; and by a dynamic linearism and use of illusionism to depict tridimensionality. Its style influenced Carolingian art and medieval art.

== History ==
=== Background ===
The Ebbo Gospels was created during the Carolingian Renaissance, a period of renewed cultural activity beginning under Charlemagne and spreading in Europe under his son Louis the Pious. Charlemagne modeled his reign on that of Constantine, who was celebrated as a martial emperor, pious Christian and patron of the arts, and made his court of Aachen a cultural center by inviting scholars and artists from all over Europe. He reestablished an education system for his clergy and bureaucracy, setting up schools and scriptoria across his empire and causing an increase in the production of manuscripts.

=== Origin ===
The Ebbo manuscript was produced in the ninth century at the Benedictine Abbaye Saint-Pierre d’Hautvillers, and is one of the earliest manuscripts from Hautvillers to not be destroyed or lost. The codex was given to Ebbo, an Archbishop of Rheims from c. 816 to 835 and from 840 to 841, by Abbot Peter of Hautvillers. The Gospel book may have been made during his first reign or for his return as archbishop in 840–841. The book is currently in the Municipal Library in Épernay, France.

== Description ==
Each page of the manuscript is 10 in by 8 in, written in the script called Carolingian minuscule, based on Roman letters that aided in easier education.

The Gospel book contains a poem to Ebbo (also spelled Ebo). The four evangelists Mark, Matthew, Luke, and John are the only figures depicted in full-page illustration.

In the foreground of his illustration, Matthew is sitting down wearing Roman clothing with his feet outstretched on his foot stool. His face is very expressive as he leans forward using the tools such as an ink horn (left hand), which contained ink, and a stylus (right hand) to write his gospel. In the background, in the upper right corner, Matthew's symbol, an angel or a man with wings, is holding a scroll. The Roman architecture of classic Byzantine and nature landscape is present in the background.

St. Mark's illustration represents him seated in a Roman stool, twisting his body to look upwards towards his symbol of a lion that is holding a scroll. His clothing consists of many lines, shadows, and highlights. Mark's facial expression is relaxed as he dips his stylus in ink to prepare for writing, in the inscribed codex rested on his leg.

In St. Luke's illustration he is sitting down looking at his symbol of an ox with his codex, ink horn, and stylus rested in his lap. Another codex is inscribed on a stand in front of Saint Luke, but his eyes are only directed towards his symbol.

St. John is illustrated as an older man with a beard, with his head surrounded by a halo. His body is twisted as he looks at his symbol of an eagle to his left, and holds a long scroll across his body.

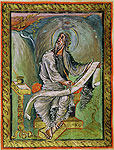
St. John's illustration in Ebbo Gospels

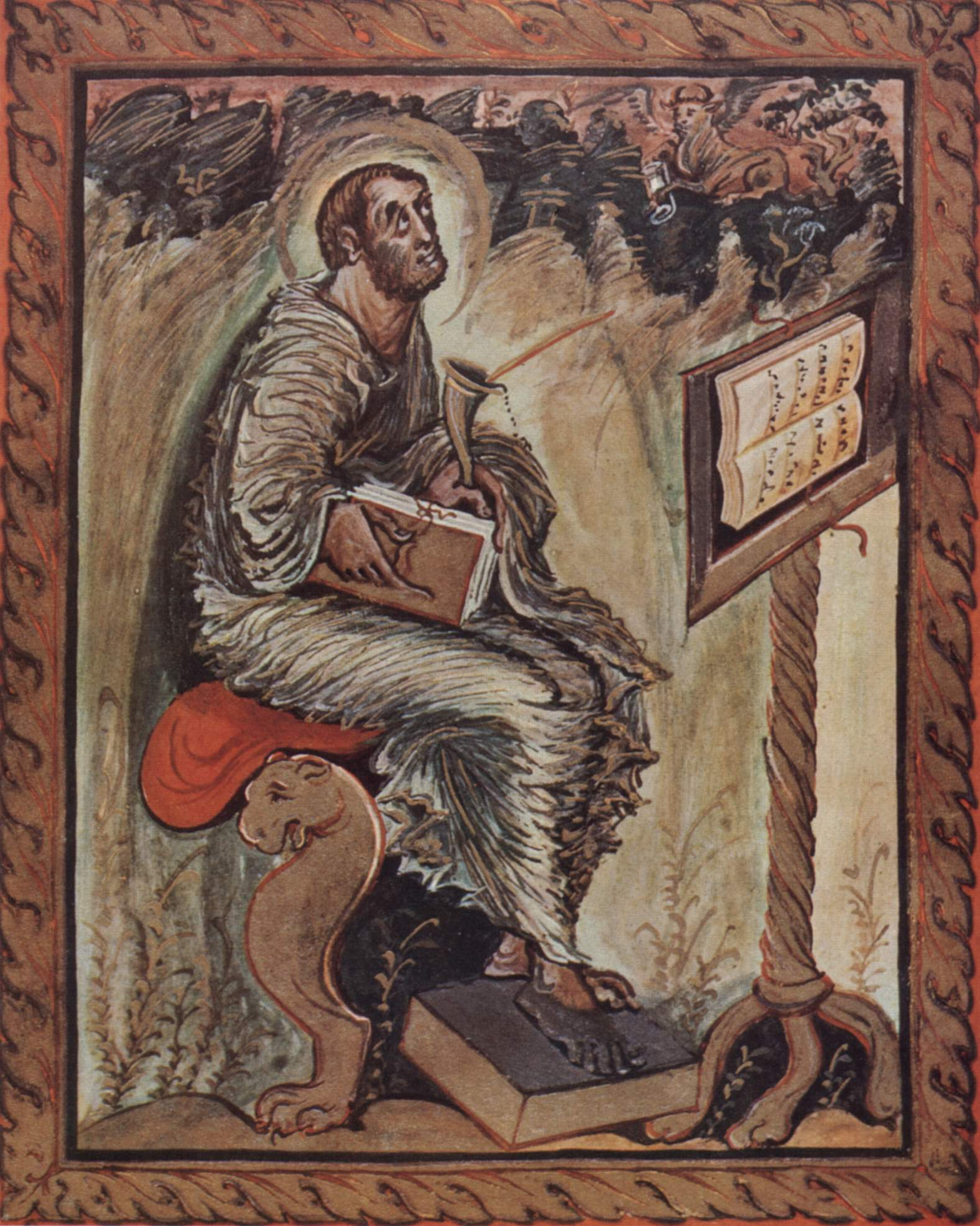
St. Luke illustration in Ebbo Gospels

== Style ==
The Ebbo Gospels style belongs to the School of Reims, originating in the 9th century. Greek artists fleeing the Byzantine iconoclasm of the 8th century brought their style to Aachen and Reims to be able to depict iconography.

The illustrations have roots in late classical painting; landscapes are represented in an illusionistic style, as a reflection of Roman culture and the landscapes are represented in an illusionistic style. The Roman influences within the art is shown within the clothing drapery, replicating the clothes of Roman philosophers in the illustration, as well as the Byzantine architecture in the background, heavily representing Rome.

External videos
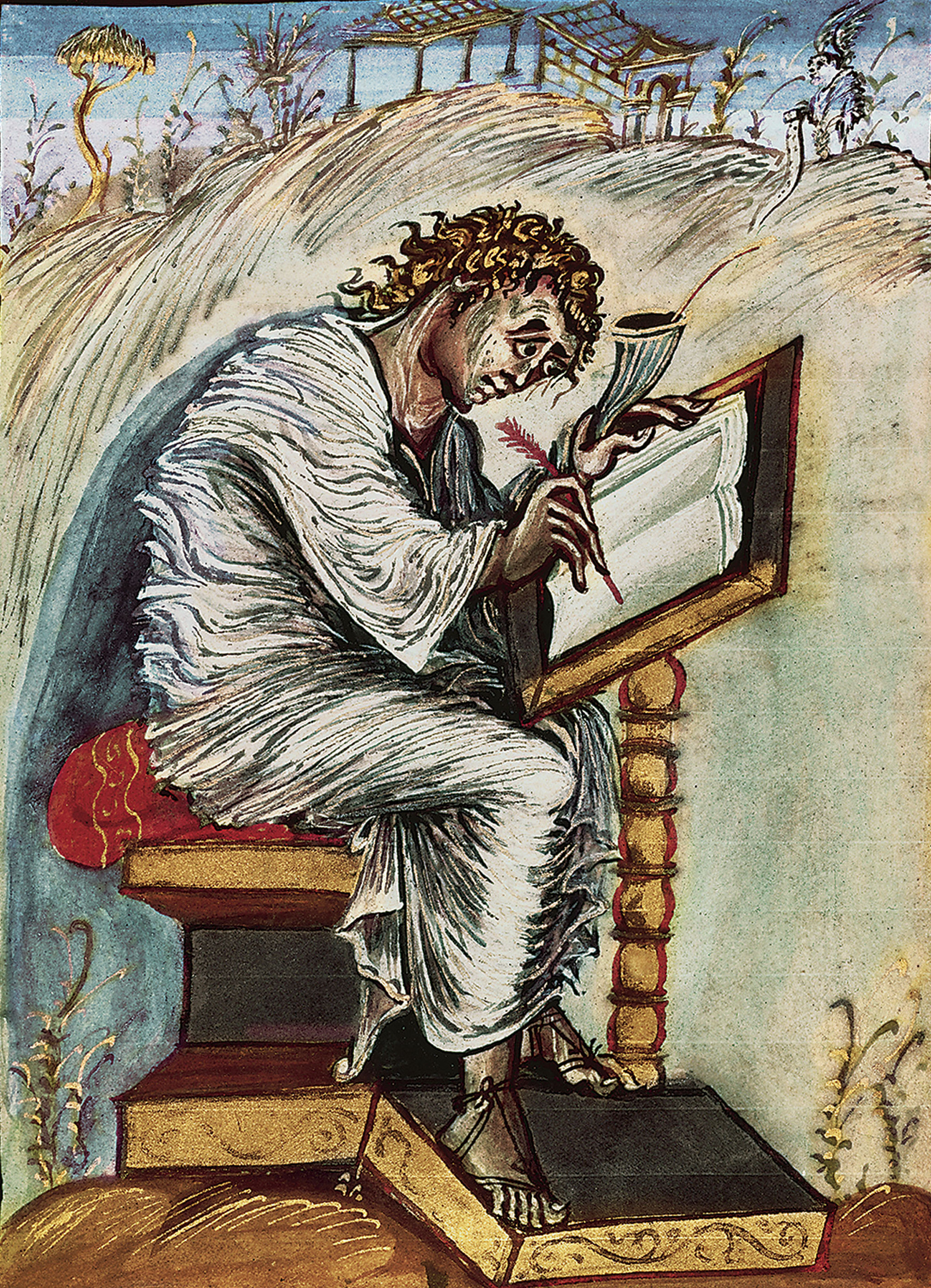
- Saint Matthew from the Ebbo Gospels, Smarthistory

The emotionalism, however, was new to Carolingian art and distinguishes the Ebbo Gospels from previous works.

Classical art was more naturalistic in replicating the human figure, while the art present in the Ebbo Gospels focused more on art style. Figures such as evangelists are made with swift brush strokes that demonstrate energy, represented in nervous, agitated poses using a streaky style with swift brush strokes.

The artists make use of perspective by adding a foreground and background. The use of three-dimensional space is demonstrated by the depiction of shadows and highlights, the coloring of the sky, furniture, and the architecture in the back. The skewed proportions such as St. Matthews unbalanced look represent the evangelists are from another world and hold great power.

=== Iconography and symbolism ===
Each of the evangelist created one gospel, and their symbols correlate to the gospel contents. Matthew is a winged-man, which connects to his gospel containing information about Gods possible relation to king David. Mark's symbol is a lion because of his crying resembling a lions roar. Luke's gospel discusses sacrifice, which correlates to his symbol an ox that connects to Christ's involvement with sacrifices, and John represents an eagle in his gospel, because eagles are able to get close to heaven. St. John also has a halo in his illustration that represents him being very holy. The Ebbo Gospels represent the "Anruftypus" style of iconography, meaning the evangelists are able to look up at their symbols. The eye contact of the saints towards the symbols allude to a connection. In the illustrations of all evangelists their symbols are holding handscrolls which creates more of a connection between the evangelists and their symbol.

=== Similar manuscripts ===
The Codex Aureus of St. Emmeram is a manuscript made in 870 following the Ebbo Gospels style. Although, the Utrecht Psalter is the most famous example made in the same Reims school. The Utrecht Psalters style possibly influenced Carolingian art with its rapid strokes, was an influence for classical art, and the course of medieval art.

Historians have noted the similarity between the Utrecht Psalter and the Ebbo Gospels. The evangelist portrait of Matthew in the Ebbo Gospels is similar to the illustration of the psalmist in the first psalm of the Utrecht Psalter. The Carolingian art could be the interpretation of the Utrecht Psalter Classical style that has quick and rapid brush-strokes.

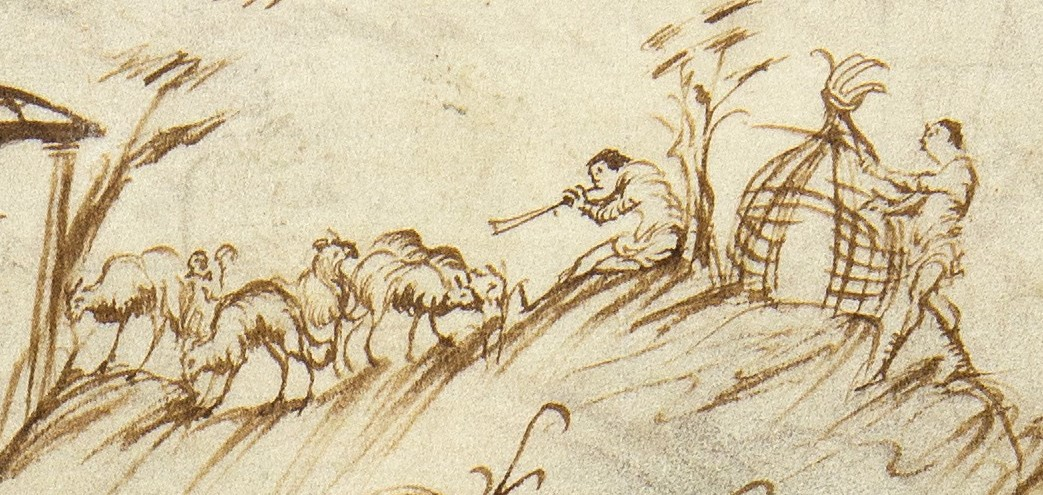
Utrechts Psalter illustration demonstrating eccentric strokes

Other images in the Ebbo Gospels appear to be based on distortions of drawings which may have been from the Utrecht Psalter. Goldschmidt, a medieval historian, claims that many of the small details of the Utrecht Psalter can be compared to the features of the Ebbo Gospels. Items such the ink, the way animals are depicted, architecture is illustrates, body language and gestures that people in these books are given, has some connection between both the Ebbo Gospels and the Psalter.

"In short, we find not one thing, whether it is a stool with a lion's head and claws, or an inkwell, whether it is the lance or the arrow of the warrior, the lions, the birds, the buildings, the figures, and the gestures that cannot be paralleled to the smallest detail in style as well as in content, in the Utrecht Psalter."

— Goldschmidt, Gertrude R. Benson, "New light on the origin of the Utrecht Psalter" (1931), p. 23.

== Notes ==
- Full Digital Reproduction of Ebbo Gospels
