= Harley Golden Gospels =

Carolingian Illuminated Manuscript

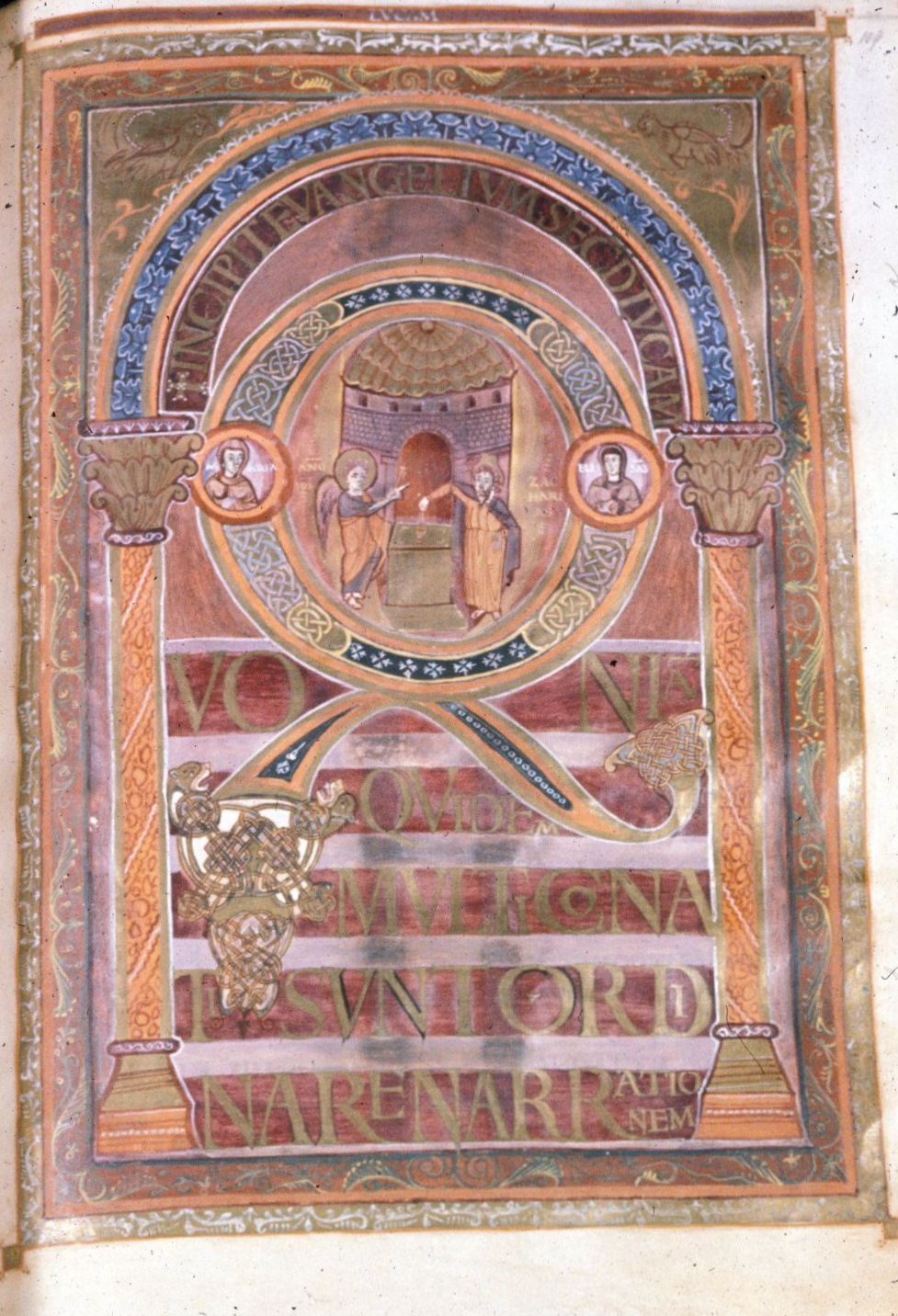
Harley Golden Gospels, Incipit to Luke, 800-825

The Harley Golden Gospels, British Library, Harley MS 2788, is a Carolingian illuminated manuscript Gospel book produced in about 800–825, probably in Aachen, Germany. It is one of the manuscripts attributed to the "Ada School", which is named after the Ada Gospels. It has four pairs of full-page Evangelist portraits and illuminated "Incipit" pages, canon tables, and other illuminations. As with other examples of the Codex Aureus (i.e. golden books), the text is written in gold ink.

== See also ==
- Aachen Gospels
- Bible of San Paolo fuori le Mura
- Codex Aureus (disambiguation)
