= Codex Aureus =

Codex Aureus is Latin for Golden Book. Several Gospel Books from the 9th through 11th centuries were so heavily illuminated with gold leaf that they were referred to as the Codex Aureus. These manuscripts include:

- Codex Aureus of Lorsch
- Golden Gospels of Henry III
- Stockholm Codex Aureus (also known as the Codex Aureus of Canterbury)
- Codex Aureus of St. Emmeram
- Codex Aureus of Echternach
- Codex aureus Gnesnensis
- Codex Aureus Pultoviensis
- Codex Aureus Anthimi, a Greek new testament from the 9th C.
- Harley Golden Gospels
