= Bible of San Paolo fuori le Mura =

9th-Century illuminated Bible

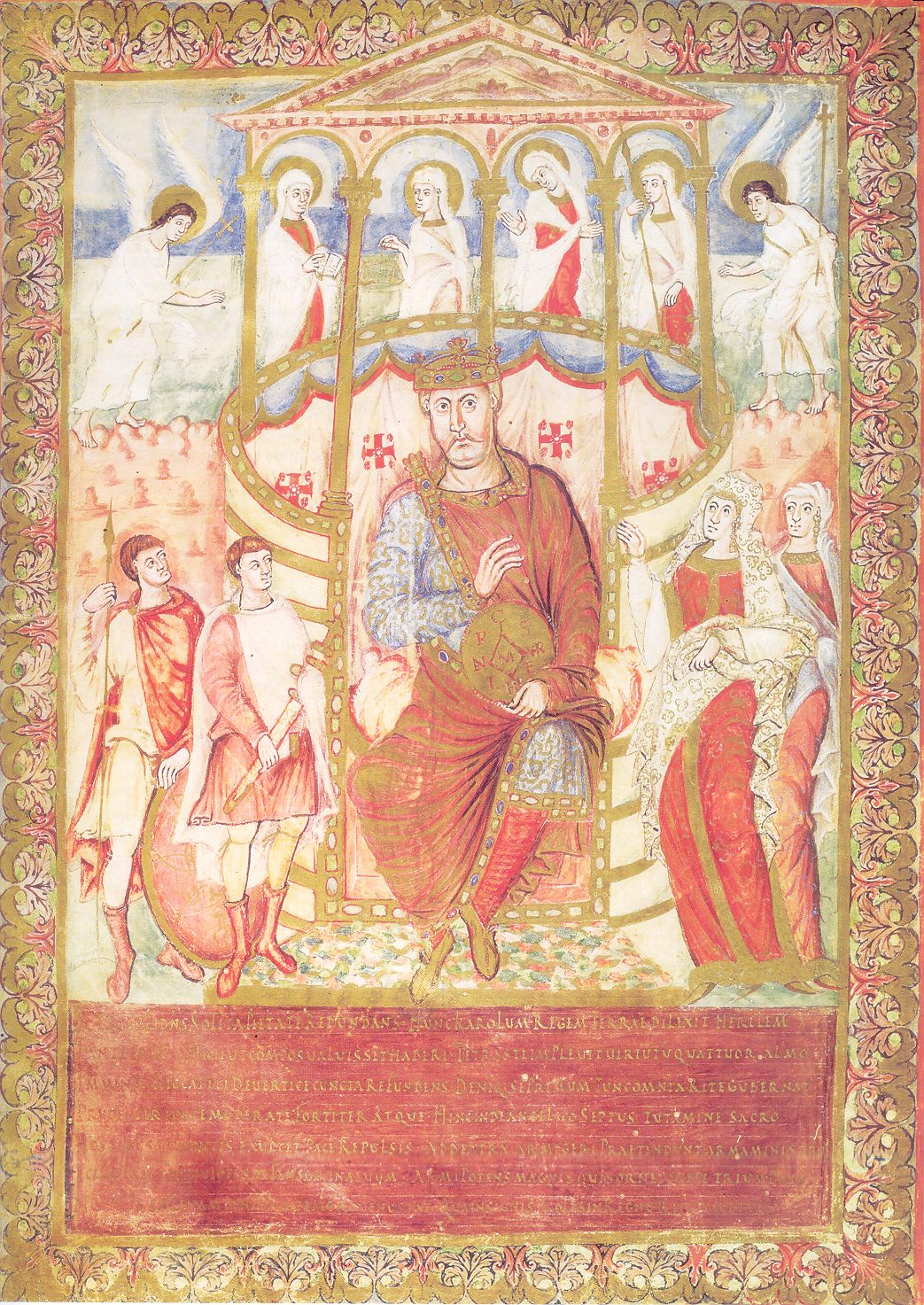
Dedication page of the Bible, depicting Charles the Bald

The Bible of San Paolo fuori le Mura is a 9th-century illuminated Bible. Of all surviving Carolingian Bibles, it is the most thoroughly illuminated.

The manuscript was produced at Rheims under the patronage of Charles the Bald, and it was presented to Pope John VIII at the coronation of Charles as Holy Roman Emperor on Christmas night, 25 December 875. The manuscript was produced between 870, the date of Charles' marriage to Richilde, and 875, the date of his coronation. During the reign of Pope Gregory VII (1073–1085), the Bible was given to the Benedictine abbey of Saint Paul Outside the Walls in Rome, where it has remained ever since.

== Content ==
The manuscript contains the entirety of the Vulgate Old and New Testaments. The 334 extant folios measure 448 by 345 mm (17.6 by 13.6 in). The text was written by a Benedictine monk named Ingobert. There are 35 decorated incipit pages, and four decorated canon tables. There are 91 decorated initials throughout the book. There are 24 surviving full-page miniature illustrations, including a dedication portrait of Charles the Bald, a portrait of Saint Jerome, 14 illustrations in the Old Testament, an image of Christ in Majesty, four evangelist portraits, a miniature in the Acts of the Apostles, a miniature for the Epistles of Paul, and a miniature for the Book of Revelation. One miniature at the beginning of the Book of Job has been lost. This is the most extensive cycle of illustrations in any surviving Carolingian Bible.

== See also ==
- Aachen Gospels
- Harley Golden Gospels
