= School of Reims =

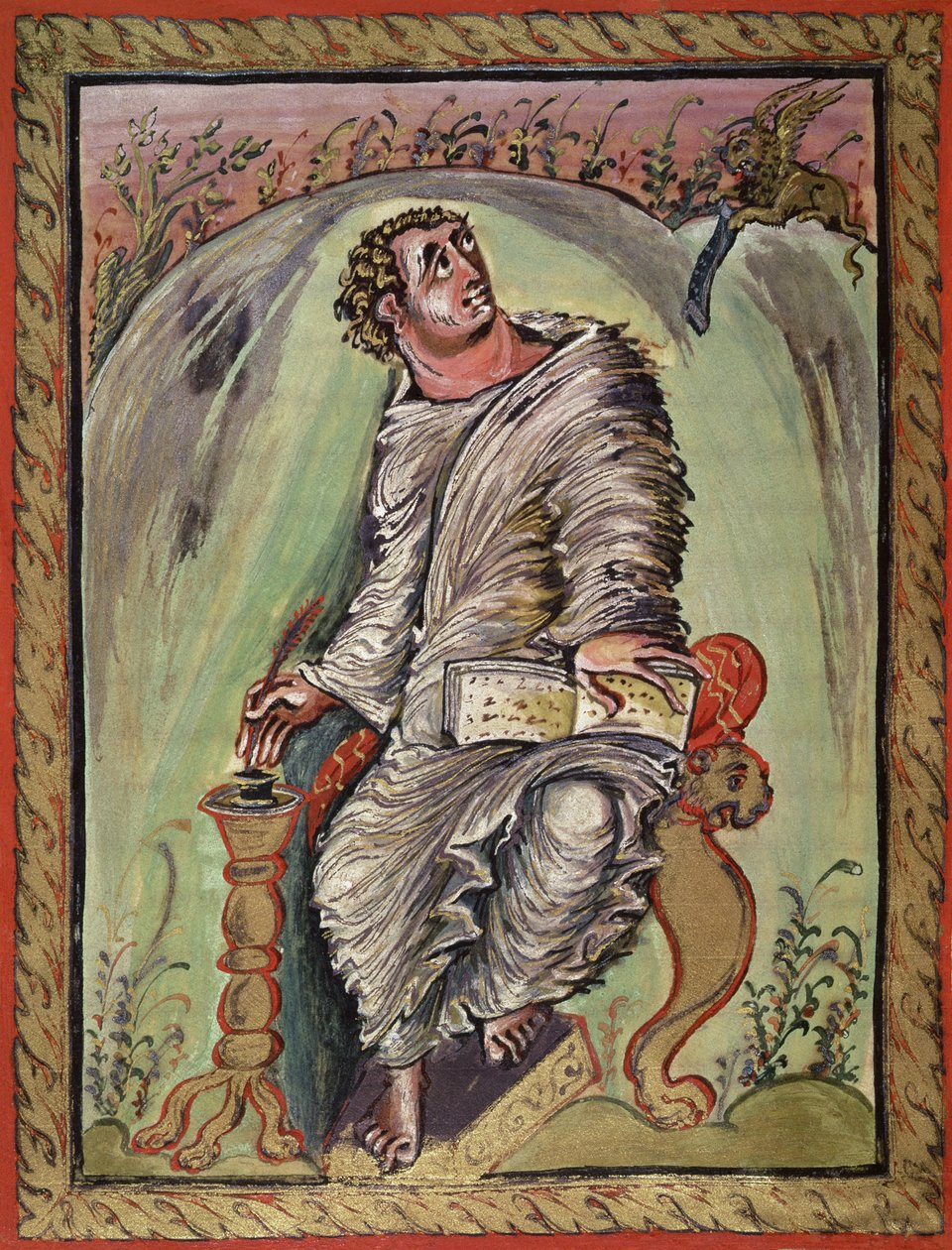
Saint Mark from the Ebbo Gospels (816–835)

The School of Reims was the cathedral school of Reims Cathedral in France that was in operation during the Middle Ages. The term is also used of an artistic style in Carolingian art, lasting into Ottonian art in works such as the gold relief figures on the cover of the Codex Aureus of Echternach, which in fact were probably made in Trier in the 890s. Archbishop Ebbo (d. 851) promoted artistic production at the abbey at Hautvillers, near the city. Major works probably made there in the 9th century include: the Ebbo Gospels (816–835), the Utrecht Psalter, which was perhaps the most important of all Carolingian manuscripts, and the Bern Physiologus.

Established by Archbishop Fulcon (822–900), the actual cathedral school attracted great names such as Hincmar, the Archbishop of Reims between 845 and 882, the chronicler Flodoard (c. 893 – 966), Richerus, monk of Saint-Remi (died after 998), and Gerbert d'Aurillac (c. 946 – 1003), who went on to become Archbishop of Reims and later Pope Sylvester II. Soon after Gerbert left the school declined in prominence and there is little record of it in the first half of the 11th century. It was restored mid-century under the leadership of Chancellor Herimann. None of Herimann's writings survive, but contemporaries describe him as a great scholar. Teaching at the school while Herimann was master was Bruno of Cologne, also a noted scholar who would later found the Carthusians after was ousted from the school in a dispute with Archbishop Manasses I of Reims. From about 1076 to 1094 the next chancellor of the school was the poet Godfrey of Rheims who maintained its high reputation.

After Godfrey the school again declined. The next Chancellor, Odalric, was much involved in political disputes in the area. He rose to become a cardinal but has no record of positive impact on the school. At the same period the nearby school at Laon led by the scholar Anselm eclipsed the school at Reims in regional prominence. Reims reemerged when Anselm died in 1117 and his most prominent student Alberich returned to his native Reims to lead the school.
