= Codex Beneventanus =

8th-century Italian book containing a Gospel

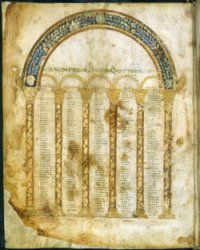
One of the canon tables from the Codex Beneventanus.

The Codex Beneventanus (British Library, Add MS 5463) is an 8th-century illuminated codex containing a Gospel Book. According to a subscription on folio 239 verso, the manuscript was written by a monk named Lupus for one Ato, who was probably Ato, abbot (736–760) of the monastery of San Vincenzo al Volturno (Saint Vincent on the Volturnus), near Benevento. The unusual odd number of Canon Tables suggests these seven folios were prepared as much as two centuries earlier than the rest of the codex.

The codex contains the Vulgate version of the four Gospels, the canon tables of Eusebius of Caesarea, the letter of Jerome to Pope Damasus (Novum opus) that St. Jerome wrote as a dedicatory prologue to the Gospels, Jerome's prologue to his Commentary on Matthew that has been used as a prologue to the Gospels in later Vulgate manuscripts (Plures fuisse), and prologues and chapter lists for each of the Gospels. The text is written on vellum in two columns in uncial script with no division between words. The running titles are in small uncials while the incipits and explicits are in capitals. The incipits and explicits are written in alternating lines of red and black ink. The subscription of Lupus is written in uncials, and also has alternating lines of red and black ink. The text contains additional punctuation and annotations in a 10th-century Beneventuan hand.

There are 240 folios of 355 by 275 mm. The folios are generally gathered into quires of eight folios each. There are a few gatherings of ten folios and a few gatherings are lacking one or more folios. The rear flyleaf (folio 240) is a piece of vellum from another manuscript and contains a fragment of a commentary on the Epistle to the Romans written in a 9th-century Carolingian minuscule that has 10th century Beneventan punctuation.

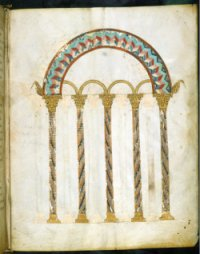
Folio 4 recto from the Codex Beneventanus, with a blank canon table.

The manuscript has decorated canon tables, initials, and incipits and explicits. The canon tables are underneath arches decorated with gold, red and blue. Both sides of folio 4 have decorated arches, but are otherwise blank. Each of the Gospels begins with an initial which is decorated in green, red, and gold. The incipits and explicits are decorated with green red and black ivy leaves.

The manuscript was owned in the 8th century by the monastery of St. Vincent on the Voturno, and may have been produced there. By the 13th century it was associated with St. Peter's convent in Benevento. In the first half of the 18th century it was owned by Richard Mead, and was used by Richard Bentley in his collation of New Testament texts. Dr. Mead may have acquired the manuscript in the 1690s when he traveled to Italy, however, the manuscript did not appear in the catalog of the sale of his library in 1754–55. The manuscript was later owned by Anthony Askew (d. 1754). It was purchased by John Jackson in 1785 at the sale of Askew's manuscripts. The British Museum purchased it in 1794 at the sale of Jackson's manuscripts and it passed to the British Library on its establishment in 1973.

== Gallery ==
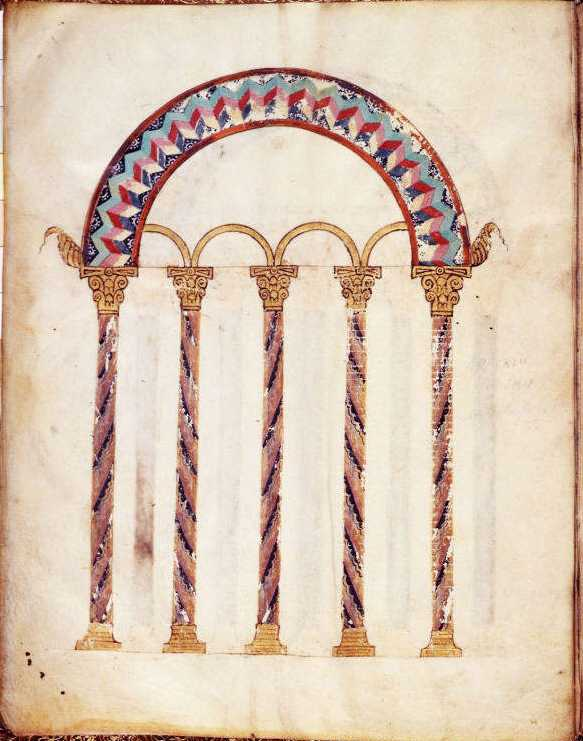
Folio 1 verso, a blank canon table.

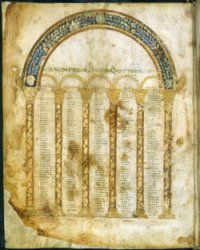
Canon Table

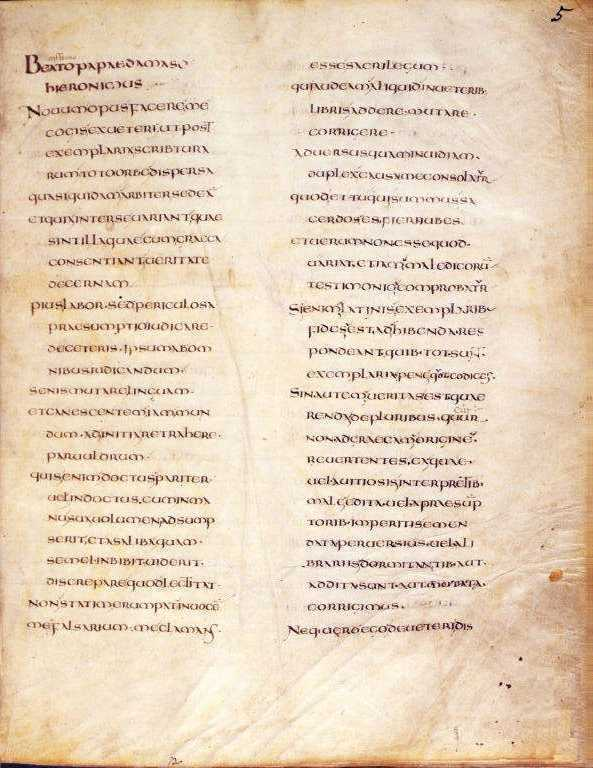
Folio 5r, Letter of St. Jerome to Pope Damasus
