= Folchard Psalter =

Carolingian illuminated manuscript

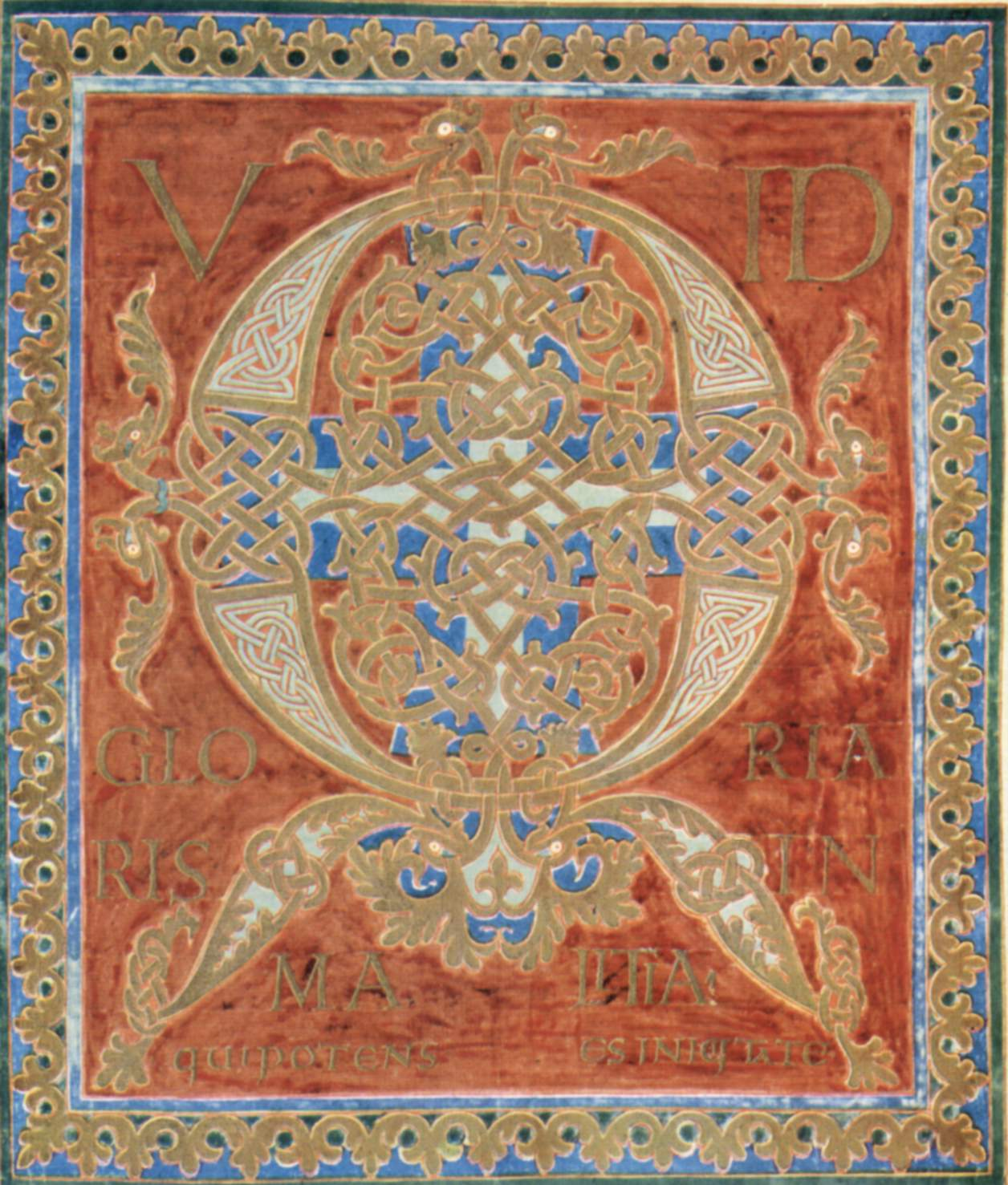
Initial "Q" of Psalm 51 (52)

The Folchart Psalter, or Folchard Psalter (St. Gall, Stiftsbibliothek, Cod. Sang. 23), is a Carolingian illuminated manuscript. It was produced about 872–883 in the scriptorium of the Abbey of St. Gall, Switzerland, under the direction of the scribe Folchardus, usually modernized as Folchard or Folchart.

Folchardus is attested to being a monk at St. Gall from 849 to 854 and 898–899. Folchardus is not mentioned in the Casus of Ekkehard IV, making his biography obscure and incomplete. He is recorded being a sub-deacon in 858, and a deacon no later than 860; he was elected prior in the Benedictine monasteries at Zürichgau and Turgovia (869-878), and at the latest in 882 was elected the senior assistant or vicar of Abbot Hartmut.

Folchardus penned, on folios 26–27, the following inscription: "Hunc praeceptoris Hartmoti iussa secutus/ Folchardus studuit rite patrare librum" ("Following the orders of Abbot Hartmut/ Folchart endeavoured to complete this book according to rules). Although Hartmoti (Hartmut) is referred to as preceptor, it really means abbot. Since he is cited as abbot it places the manuscript during his tenure of office 872-883.

Portraits of the tonsured Folchardus, holding the Psalter and bowing towards the abbot (far left side of tympanum painting of King David receiving his harp) and Abbot Harmut prepared to receive the Psalter with open arms (far right side of tympanum painting of the Ark of the Covenant transported by an oxen drawn wagon) are each found on the extreme ends of the folio on either side of the centralized bust of Christ in the spandrel on the “Dedication Page” on folio 12. He is also probably the artist of the Lindau Gospels in the Morgan Library, New York.

The initial letter Q of Psalm 51 (52) is often cited as a masterpiece of late Carolingian illumination.

The St. Gall Collegiate Library Accession for this manuscript is designated as “Cod. Sang. 23”—for Codex Sangallenses no. 23. Dimensions: 38 x 29 cm.

== See also ==
- List of key works of Carolingian illumination
- Carolingian art

== Links to Folchart Psalter Folios ==
- http://www.eye.ch/swissgen/kant/sgstia-q.htm
- Two Double-Columned Bifolia
- Facsimile on e-codices.ch

== Bibliography ==
- Eggenberger, Christoph, Psalterium
- Folchardi : (Stiftsbibliothek Sankt Gallen, Cod. 23) : Beschreibung der buchkünstlerischen Ausstattung. Codices illuminati medii aevi; 11 (München : H. Lengenfelder, 1989)
- Landsberger, Franz, Der St. Galler Folchart-Psalter; eine Initialenstudie. (St. Gallen, Fehr, 1912)
- Ochsenbein, Peter and Beat Matthias von Scarpatetti, Der Folchart-Psalter aus der Stiftsbibliothek St. Gallen (1987)
- Schmid, Alfred A. ed., Riforma religiosa e arti nell'epoca carolingia. Atti del XXIV Congresso internazinale di storia dell'arte, 1, (Bologna 1983): 99–107.
