= Wulfar =

Carolingian archbishop

- Archbishop of Reims
- Church: Catholic Church
- Archdiocese: Archdiocese of Reims
- In office: 812 – 816
- Predecessor: Tilpin
- Successor: Ebbo

Personal details
- Died: 816 Reims, Francia

Wulfar or Wulfaire (Note: Textual variant of Wulfar's name include Wolfarius, Wolpharius, Woltfarius, Wilfarius, Wualfarius and Vulferius. In French it is sometimes Vulfaire.) (died 816) was the archbishop of Reims from 812 until his death. He was an important administrator in the Carolingian Empire, both before and during his episcopate, under the emperors Charlemagne and Louis the Pious.

In 802 Wulfar was the royal missus (representative) in a missaticum comprising the southeast of the ecclesiastical province of Reims. His term as a missus is only recorded the History of the Church of Reims (Historia Remensis ecclesiae) of Flodoard (died 966), in a section based on the Capitulare missorum specialia of 802. The name of Wulfar's lay associate (since missi always worked in clerical–lay pairs) is unknown. Jacques Stiennon first identified a denier from the reign of Charlemagne bearing the inscription FUIFAR as belonging to the missaticum of Wulfar and recording his name as that of the moneyer in charge. An alternate reading and interpretation of this inscription—FIUFAR or ARFIUF, meaning Strasbourg, the location of the mint—has been put forward.

Wulfar also served Charlemagne as a legate in Rhaetia in 807. According to Flodoard, "that Emperor Charlemagne put a great deal of trust in [Wulfar] is proven by the fact that he committed to his safekeeping fifteen noble hostages of the Saxons whom he had brought back from Saxony." As the Saxons were still largely pagan at the time, placing these hostages in an ecclesiastical environment furthered the Christianization of their people. According to Charlemagne's contemporary biographer, Einhard, Wulfar was one of the bishops who witnessed and signed the emperor's testament of 811, in which he divided his empire between his surviving sons.

The archbishops of Reims began issuing a type of document called an ordinatio servitiorum ("ordering of services"), an early form of polyptych, in the eighth century. These documents recorded the estates owned by the archbishopric and reorganized them on a more rational and permanent footing. Wulfar, Flodoard records, "made coloniae of some estates of the church of Reims, properly distributed and described." Wulfar was also responsible for introducing the office of advocatus ecclesiae into the province of Reims. Wulfar's predecessors had used the terms agentes and actores, and the office may not have changed when Wulfar introduced the term advocatus.

Wulfar was the hosting archbishop at the Council of Reims of 813. In 814, he held a synod at Noyon for the bishops, abbots and some of the counts of his province. He died in 816, perhaps as early as 18 June. Some sources say that he was alive but gravely ill in October 816, when Pope Stephen IV visited the cathedral of Reims in order to crown the Emperor Louis the Pious. In a letter to Pope Nicholas I in 867, King Charles the Bald refers to the coronation of his father in 816 and to the death of Wulfar "around that time" (eo tempore). The historian of the church of Reims, Flodoard, writing a century later, also placed Wulfar's death shortly after or during the papal visit. Immediately after his death, the people and clergy of the city elected Gislemar as his replacement. When the bishops of the province gathered to confirm him, they found him unable to read the Vulgate Bible in its Latin and the emperor's candidate, Ebbo, was chosen archbishop instead.

== Sources ==
- Buirette, Claude (1857). Histoire de la ville de Sainte-Ménehould et de ses environs. Sainte-Ménehould: Poignée-Darnauld.
- Duckett, Eleanor Shipley (1969). Carolingian Portraits: A Study in the Ninth Century. Ann Arbor Paperbacks.
- Depreux, Philippe (1997). Prosopographie de l'entourage de Louis le Pieux (781–840). Sigmaringen: Jan Thorbecke.
- Goffart, Walter (1972). "From Roman Taxation to Mediaeval Seigneurie: Three Notes (Part II)". Speculum. 47 (3): 373–94. doi:10.2307/2856151. JSTOR 2856151. S2CID 162371126.
- Kosto, Adam J. (2003). "Hostages in the Carolingian world (714–840)". Early Medieval Europe. 11 (2): 123–47. doi:10.1111/1468-0254.00105. S2CID 154868894.
- Lavelle, Ryan (2006). "The Use and Abuse of Hostages in Later Anglo-Saxon England". Early Medieval Europe. 14 (3): 269–96. doi:10.1111/j.1468-0254.2006.00183.x. S2CID 153491764.
- McKitterick, Rosamond (1983). The Frankish Kingdoms under the Carolingians, 751–987. London: Longman.
- Metcalf, D. M. (1966). "Fiufar or Arfiuf = Strasbourg". Hamburger Beiträge zur Numismatik. 20: 380–84.
- Naismith, Rory (2012). "Kings, Crisis and Coinage Reforms in the Mid-Eighth Century". Early Medieval Europe. 20 (3): 291–332. doi:10.1111/j.1468-0254.2012.00345.x. S2CID 161914296.
- Schrör, Matthias (2011). "Aufstieg und Fall des Erzbishofs Ebo von Reims". In Becher, Matthias; Plassmann, Alheydis (eds.). Streit am Hof im frühen Mittelalter. Bonn University Press. pp. 203–22.
- Stiennon, Jacques (1960). "Le denier de Charlemagne au nom de Roland". Cahiers de Civilisation Médiévale. 3 (1): 87–95. doi:10.3406/ccmed.1960.1133. hdl:2268/307439.
- West, Charles (2009). "The Significance of the Carolingian Advocate" (PDF). Early Medieval Europe. 17 (2): 186–206. doi:10.1111/j.1468-0254.2009.00259.x.
