= Letter of Jerome to Pope Damasus =

Letter from Jerome requesting new translations of the gospels (c. 376/377 AD)

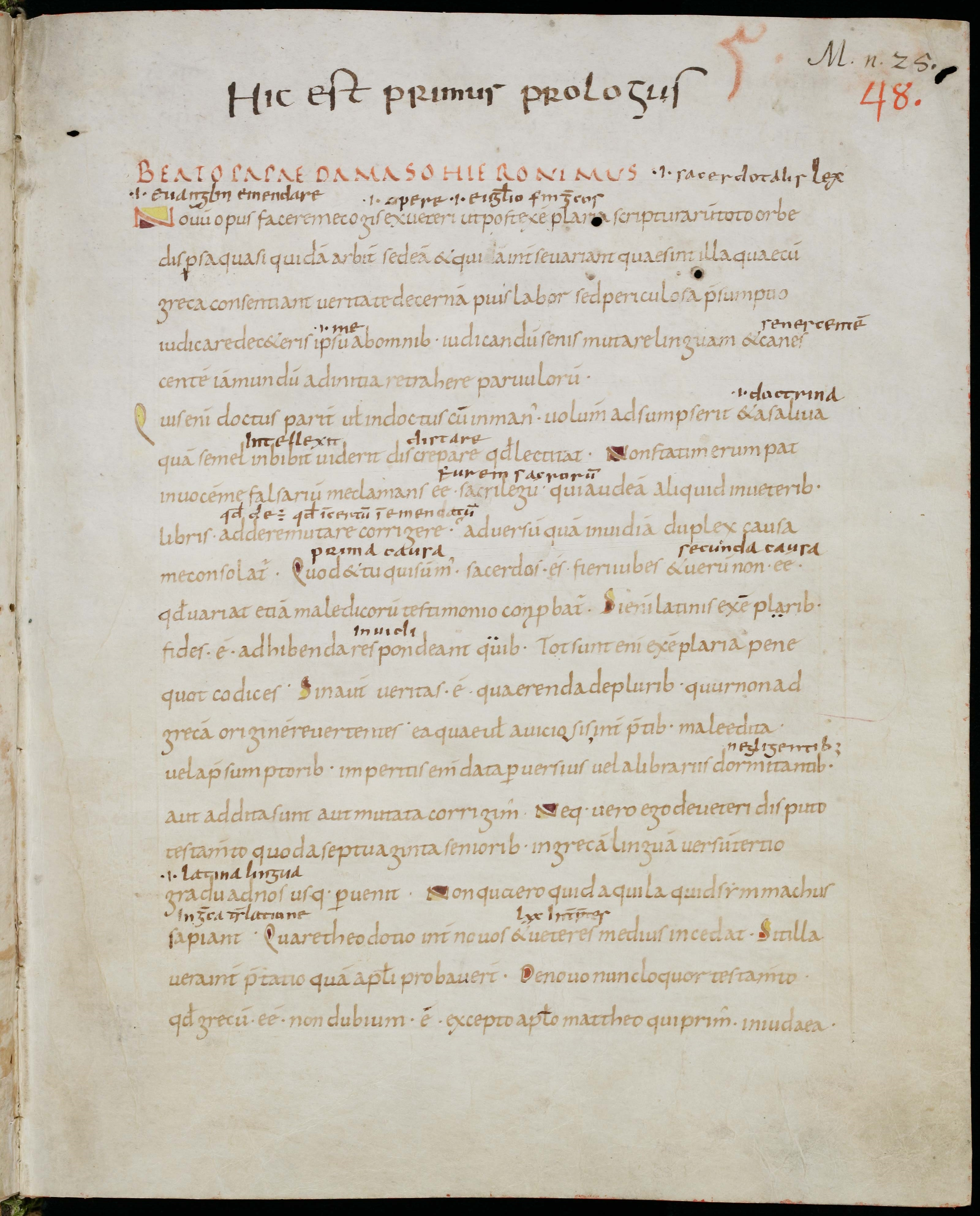
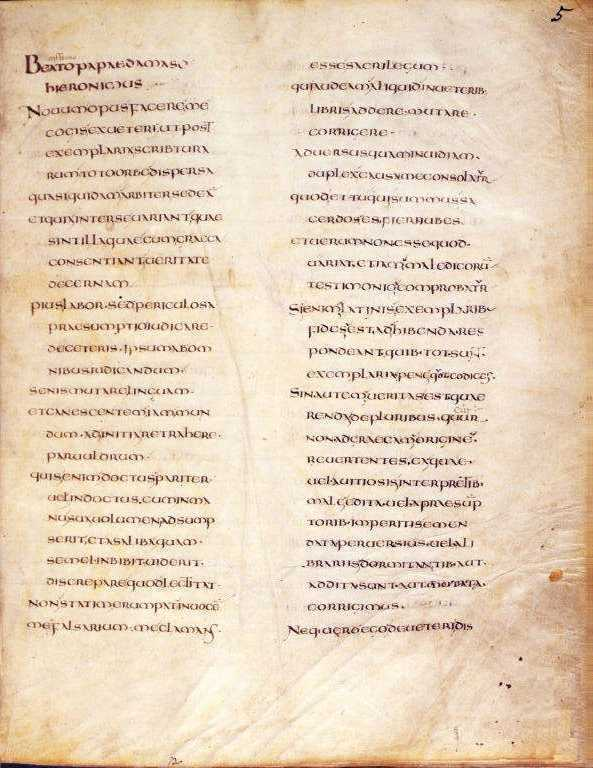
The beginning of the Epistle in Codex Sangallensis 48 (left) and in Codex Beneventanus (right)

The Letter of Jerome to Pope Damasus I (Latin: Epistula Hieronymi ad Damasum papam, incipit Novum opus), written in 376 or 377 AD, is a response from Jerome to Pope Damasus I's letter urging him to make a new Latin translation of the four gospels, to replace the Vetus Latina translation. The letter predates the 382–405 period when Jerome worked on his translation, the Vulgate.

In the epistle, Jerome agreed that the Vetus Latina translation of the four gospels should be revised and corrected, acknowledging the numerous differences between every Latin manuscript such that each one looked like its own version. To remedy the problem, Jerome agreed that they should be corrected on the basis of the Greek manuscripts (Greek New Testament). Jerome explained why the old Latin order of the Gospels (Matthew, John, Luke, Mark) should be changed to Matthew, Mark, Luke, John, because it is the order of the Greek manuscripts. He also explained the importance of the Eusebian Canons and how to use them.

Copies of the letter occur in many Latin manuscript Gospel books and Bibles (even in old Latin Codex Sangallensis 48). Usually it is placed at the beginning of the gospel book (e.g. Codex Sangallensis 48 or the Lindau Gospels).

== See also ==
- Codex Amiatinus
- Prologus Galeatus
