= Alberic of Reims =

Archbishop of Bourges

Alberic of Reims (c. 1085 – 1141) was a scholar who studied under Anselm of Laon and later became an opponent of Peter Abelard.

He was originally from Reims, but moved to nearby Laon to study under Anselm and his brother Ralph. When Anselm died he returned to his hometown to take a position at the School of Reims, restoring that school to its earlier prominence. He also served as Archdeacon of Reims from 1131 to 1136. He was reluctantly promoted by the Pope to be Archbishop of Bourges in 1136 and served there until his death in 1141. Other than a single letter, no writings of Alberic survive. He was considered one of the great scholars of his age by his contemporaries. His specialty, building on the work of Anslem, was commentaries on the Christian Bible.

Alberic along with another student of Anselm's, Lotulf of Lombardy, instigated proceedings against Peter Abelard, charging him with the heresy of Sabellius in a provincial synod held at Soissons in 1121. Alberic was a follower of the longstanding approach of judging theological arguments by the historical authority or who had made them. This view was rapidly undermined by Abelard's dialectical approach that came to dominate.
