= Lindau Gospels =

Illuminated manuscript

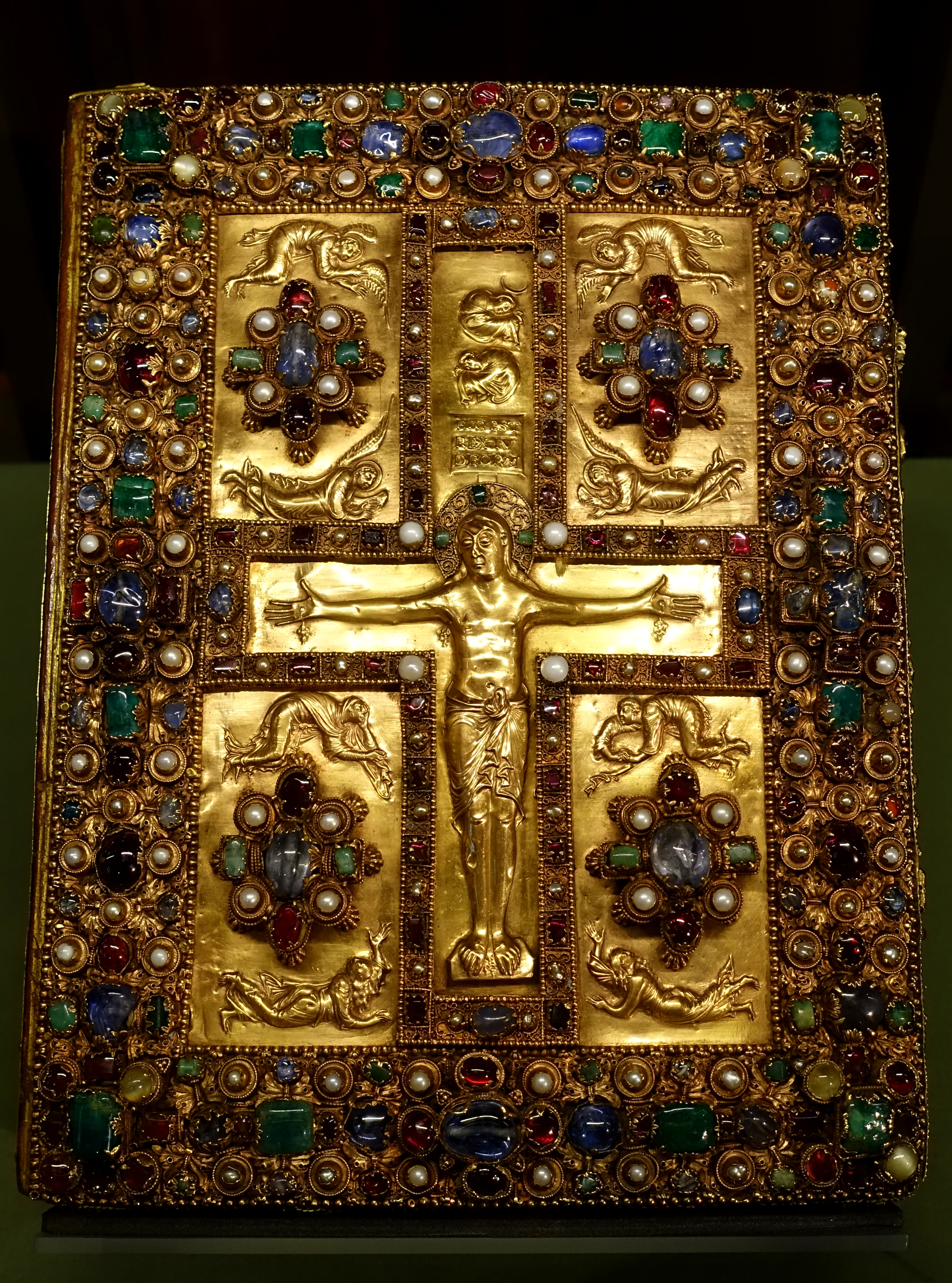
The front cover, mostly by a 9th century Carolingian royal workshop

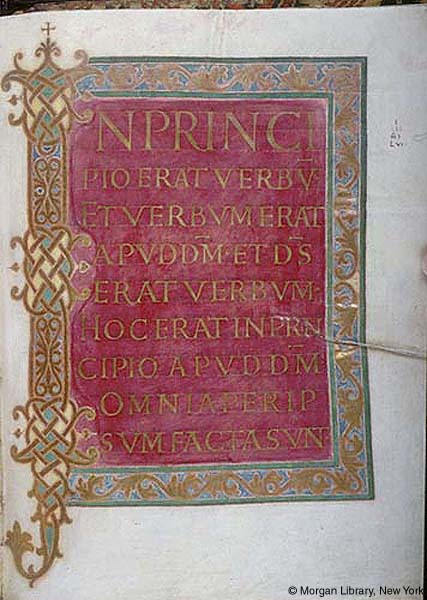
Folio 168r, with the beginning of the Gospel of John

The lower cover, mostly 8th century

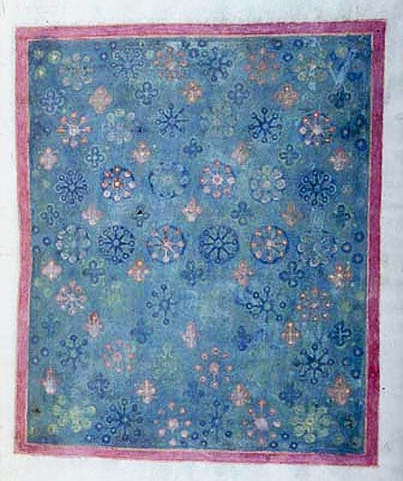
Folio 12r, imitating textile

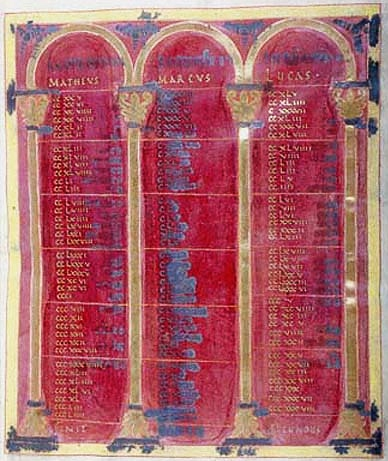
Folio 8r, one of the canon tables

The Lindau Gospels is an illuminated manuscript in the Morgan Library in New York, which is important for its illuminated text, but still more so for its treasure binding, or metalwork covers, which are of different periods. The oldest element of the book is what is now the back cover, which was probably produced in the later 8th century in modern Austria, but in the context of missionary settlements from Britain or Ireland, as the style is that of the Insular art of the British Isles. The upper cover is late Carolingian work of about 880, and the text of the gospel book itself was written and decorated at the Abbey of Saint Gall around the same time, or slightly later.

When J.P. Morgan, already in his early sixties, bought the book in 1901, it was his first major purchase of a medieval manuscript, setting the direction that much of his subsequent collecting was to follow.

== Covers ==
=== Lower cover ===
The lower or back cover is older than the text and presumably added from another book, perhaps around the time the text was written. It was perhaps originally a front cover. It is the only largely intact example of a very early Insular metal bookcover to survive, although we know from documentary records that famous works like the Book of Kells and the Lindisfarne Gospels had them. A few Irish cumdachs or metal book-shrines or reliquaries for books have survived, which show broadly comparable styles, and use crosses as the central feature of their designs. The style is close to that of the other main survival of essentially Anglo-Saxon work executed on the Continent, the Tassilo Chalice, and also a number of works executed by local workshops in several parts of Europe. However, the St Cuthbert Gospel (British Library), a decorated leather binding thought to date from around 700 to 730, is the earliest intact European binding.

The design centres on a cross pattée, that is, a cross with curving, spreading members. The spaces between the members of the cross are filled with chip-carved interlace including snake-like beasts and a central stud set with a gem. Each arm of the cross has a figure of Christ with a cruciform halo. What distinguishes the cover from the few other surviving pieces of Insular metalwork is the extensive use of enamel, which it is thought may have been learned from north Italy. Some of the enamels are in a style of "sunk enamel" (senkschmelz in German) only found here and in plaques on the Agate Casket of Oviedo. These show "brightly coloured, long-legged birds" set into and surrounded by the plain gold background, as opposed to the normal champlevé technique of "full enamel" (vollschmelz) where the whole surface of a plaque section is covered in enamel.

The original book covered was slightly smaller, and parts of the borders, which do not match each other, were added to bring it up to the new size. Inside the border there are four plaques in the corners showing the Four Evangelists with their symbols, which are 16th century additions. Around the central topaz are four monograms: "IHS, XPS, DNS, NOS" (Jesus Christ Our Lord).

=== Upper cover ===
The upper cover (not illustrated here, see note for image) is very lavishly studded with large gems, and uses low repoussé relief. The composition also centres on a cross, but here a whole Crucifixion scene with a figure of Jesus on the cross and much smaller ones of the Virgin Mary and John the Evangelist. Each of these is in a compartment below the arms of the cross, paired with iconographically unusual female figures; the matching compartments above the arms each contain two angels. Identifications for these lower figures vary; they are described by the Morgan Library as anonymous mourners, "two dishevelled female figures thought to be personifications of Christian souls saluting their Redeemer" as their file note puts it but Peter Lasko, calls them instead "the curiously duplicated figure of St Mary Magdalen (?)" To Needham they are Mary Magdalene and Mary Cleophas. All eight figures are represented crouching or sideways, or hovering horizontally in the case of the angels, above and below clusters of gems.

Sol and Luna, personifications of the sun and moon, occupy the top of the cross's shaft, a common feature in Crucifixion scenes of the period, although unusually they are here shown on the shaft of the cross itself, above Christ and with Luna above Sol. More usually they are to either side of the cross-shaft, or at the ends of the arms. Also Sol here lacks his usual rays, suggesting an eclipse is represented, following the Gospels. The border contains most of the gems, held in typically Carolingian plant motif settings, which are exceptionally finely executed.

The cover of the Codex Aureus of St. Emmeram, which can be precisely dated to 870, is probably a product of the same workshop, though there are differences of style. This workshop is associated with the Holy Roman Emperor Charles II (the Bald), and often called his "Palace School". Its location (if it had a fixed one) remains uncertain and much discussed, but Saint-Denis Abbey outside Paris is one leading possibility. The Arnulf Ciborium (a miniature architectural ciborium rather than the vessel for hosts), now in the Munich Residenz, is the third major work in the group, along with the frame of an antique serpentine dish in the Louvre. Recent scholars tend to group the Lindau Gospels and the Arnulf Ciborium in closer relation to each other than the Codex Aureus to either.

== Text and illumination ==
The text is the "Four Gospels preceded by the Epistle of S. Jerome: Ad Damasum, Canon Tables and Prefaces, followed by a Capitulary", written and illuminated in "a not particularly elegant" Carolingian minuscule, the miniatures perhaps or probably by Folchard of St Gall, who portrayed himself in the Folchard Psalter. The style of illumination lacks the Insular elements of that work. The borders are grand and elegant variations on classicising foliage motifs, and the large initials reflect the Carolingian development of Insular motifs such as interlace within an essentially classicising style. Six or seven scribes worked on the text, one shared with the Folchard Psalter. The illuminations, unlike the covers, entirely lack human figures. The two pages imitating textiles interest scholars because many carpet pages, as their name suggests, may do the same. In both cases the idea may have been the "emulation of a textile shroud or cover", such as those used to wrap relics. Similar pages are found in the Ottonian Codex Aureus of Echternach. In a similar way carpet pages may have been regarded as a form of interior cover.

The main decorated pages are:

- f5r and 12r: Two pages imitating textiles, with different patterns (real Eastern silks of the 9th and 10th centuries are used as the end-papers)
- f6r - 11v: Canon tables, on vellum dyed purple, lettered in gold and (badly oxidised) silver, with arcaded surrounds in gold and silver.
- f13v and 14r: Incipit to Matthew on purple with cross and decoration, and full page initial L mostly in green with other letters in gold Roman script on purple field.
- f71v and 72r: Incipit to Mark, with gold Roman letters on purple field, and on 72r a large decorated initial I at the left-hand side of the page.
- f111v and 112r: Incipit to Luke, similar, with full-page initial F
- f167v and 168r: Incipit to John, similar with initial I down left side of 168r.

== History ==
External videos
- Lindau Gospels Cover, Smarthistory

It cannot be said with any certainty when, where and how the three main elements of the book in its present state came together. The text may well be the Gospel book commissioned by Hartmut, Abbot of St Gall between 872–883, which is a plausible date for the text. It is recorded that this book was "decorated with gold and silver and precious stones". In 1545 these gospels were said still to be in the Abbey library of Saint Gall, shortly before the library was attacked by Calvinists, and some of the contents destroyed or dispersed.

The manuscript is first certainly documented in 1691 when it was described by a visitor to an aristocratic convent on the island of Lindau on the Bavarian side of the Bodensee, which was founded long after the book was created. The leather spine of the book is stamped with the date 1594, but it is not absolutely certain where the book was when it was rebound, nor can the possibility be entirely excluded that the present combination of text and covers only dates back this far. Paul Needham notes that while the upper cover is from the Imperial workshop, and in the grandest and most luxurious style of the period, the text, while richly illuminated, does not appear to quite match the cover in richness, and is not even the most lavishly decorated text written in St Gall during this period. The cover also appears to have been designed for a slightly smaller book. Treasure covers are relatively easy to transfer, as they are only attached to the wooden boards of the binding by small nails. On the other hand, the additional sections enlarging the lower cover are clearly early medieval.

In 1803 the convent was dissolved by the state and its possessions distributed among the canonesses. The book was given to Canoness Antoinette, Baroness von Enzberg. From her heirs and Joseph von Laßberg it passed via Henry G. Bohn to Bertram Ashburnham, 4th Earl of Ashburnham (1797–1878) in 1846. Ashburnham's great collections were gradually dispersed by his son, and in 1901 the book was bought by J.P. Morgan (1867–1943) and later donated to his Morgan Library. The purchase was encouraged by Morgan's nephew, who wrote from London that "the British Museum would like to buy it but have not the money necessary", and that an offer of £8,000 by another had been refused, and £10,000 was being asked for. A few years earlier the British Museum had had considerable difficulty raising £8,000 to buy the Royal Gold Cup.
