= Golden Book =

The usage of the title Golden Book includes:

- Golden Books was the children's book imprint of Western Publishing, later Golden Books Publishing and now Random House/Penguin Random House
  - Little Golden Books and Giant Golden Books children's series
  - Golden Book Encyclopedia
  - The Golden Book Magazine, a magazine publishing short fiction that ran from 1925 to 1939
- Codex Aureus (Latin for Golden Book) are several Gospel books from the 9th through 11th centuries that were heavily illuminated with gold leaf
- Libro d'Oro (English: Golden Book) is the official register of the Kingdom of Italy, compiled by consulting heraldry
- The Golden Boke of Marcus Aurelius Emperour and Eloquent Oratour (1535), by Antonio de Guevara, translated by Lord Berners
- The Golden Book of Cycling was created in 1932 to celebrate "the Sport and Pastime of Cycling by recording outstanding rides, deeds and accomplishments"

== See also ==
- Golden Brooks
