= Ebbo =

9th-century Archbishop of Rheims

Ebbo, Ebo or Epo (c. 775 – 20 March 851) was the Archbishop of Rheims from 816 until 835 and again from 840 to 841. He was born a German serf on the royal demesne of Charlemagne. He was educated at his court and became the librarian and councillor of Louis the Pious, king of Aquitaine, son of Charlemagne. When Louis became emperor, he appointed Ebbo to the see of Rheims, then vacant after the death of Wulfaire.

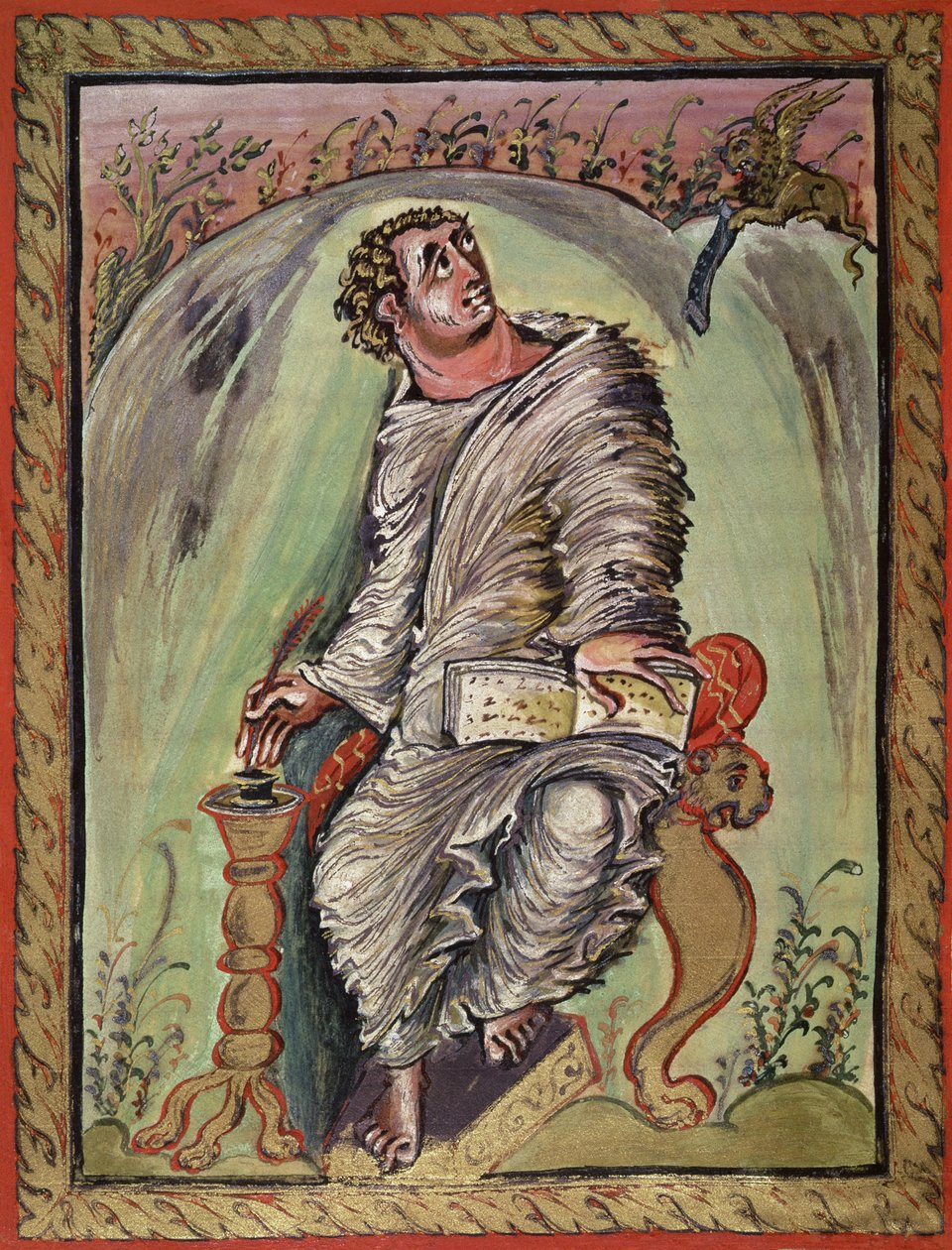
Saint Mark from the Ebbo Gospels. Line figurine in colour drawn for Ebbo in Hautvillers by artists assembled and patronised by Ebbo.

He was an important figure in the spread of Christianity in the north of Europe. At the insistence of Louis, in 822, he went to Rome and asked Pope Pascal I to become the papal legate to the North. He was licensed to preach to the Danes and he and Halitgar, bishop of Cambrai, and Willerich, bishop of Bremen, went there in 823. He made short subsequent trips, but all with little success. Ansgar was more successful a few years later.

When Louis's sons by his first marriage to Ermengarde of Hesbaye (Lothair, Louis, and Pepin) rebelled in 830, Ebbo remained loyal. But in 833 he joined the insurrection and on 13 November presided over the synod in the church of Saint Mary in Soissons which deposed Louis and forced him to publicly confess many crimes, none of which he had, in fact, committed. As a reward, Lothair gave Ebbo the Abbey of Saint Vaast.

He then became a loyal follower of Lothair. He remained with him even after Louis's reinstatement in March 834. When Lothair had to flee to Italy, however, Ebbo was too ill with gout to follow and took shelter with a Parisian hermit. He was found by Louis' men and imprisoned in the Abbey of Fulda. Events of the previous year were soon reversed. He was brought to the Synod of Thionville (2 February 835) and made to admit, in front of 43 bishops, that Louis had never committed the crimes of which he had accused him. Ebbo publicly recanted from the pulpit in Mainz on 28 February. The Synod then promptly deposed him. He was again imprisoned in Fulda and later given to Fréculf, bishop of Lisieux, and later to Boso, abbot of Fleury.

Ebbo was restored when Louis died and Lothair succeeded him in December 840. A year later, however, Charles the Bald was in control of France and Ebbo was deposed a second time. Hincmar was appointed to succeed him in 845 and refused to recognise his acts during his reinstatement. They were declared invalid by the Council of Soissons in 853.

Ebbo went to the court of Lothair, but Pope Sergius II ignored his pleas to be reinstated (again). When Lothair had no use for Ebbo, however, he was forced to leave that court and go to that of Louis the German. Louis made him Bishop of Hildesheim (between April 845 and October 847) and it was in this position that he died on 20 March 851, in the seat of his diocese.

He wrote the Apologeticum Ebbonis in defence of his reinstatement. It was probably one of his ordinations from the period of his reinstatement who penned the Pseudo-Isidorean Decretals. He also assembled artists at Hautvillers who transformed Carolingian art into a new movement and founded the so-called Reims school. The beautiful Gospel Book of Ebbo is their most well known product. His influence in the Carolingian Renaissance is enormous in the realm of art and illumination.

Catholic Church titles
Preceded by Wulfaire	Archbishop of Reims; 816–835	Succeeded by Hincmar
Preceded by Rembert	Bishop of Hildesheim; 835–847	Succeeded by Altfrid
