= Godfrey of Rheims =

11th-century Roman poet

Godfrey of Rheims (died c. 1094) was an 11th century poet. He was born in Rheims and educated at the Cathedral School of Rheims. He was appointed chancellor of the school in 1076 or 1077 by Archbishop Manasses I. In 1080 Manasses was deposed and fled to the court of the Holy Roman Emperor, but Godfrey remained in his position at the school. He held that position until 1094, but the year after a charter has the name of a new chancellor and it is presumed Godfrey died.

He was a friend of fellow poet Baldric of Dol, and the limited information on Godfrey's life comes from Baldric's works in praise of him. Four of his poems survive. Written in Latin they show clear influence of Virgil and Ovid. Godfrey is an early example of a scholar looking back to the classical traditions. Godfrey seems to have been closer in spirit to the Italian humanists of the Quattrocento than to most of his contemporaries."
