= Aachen Gospels (Ada School) =

9th-century illuminated manuscript

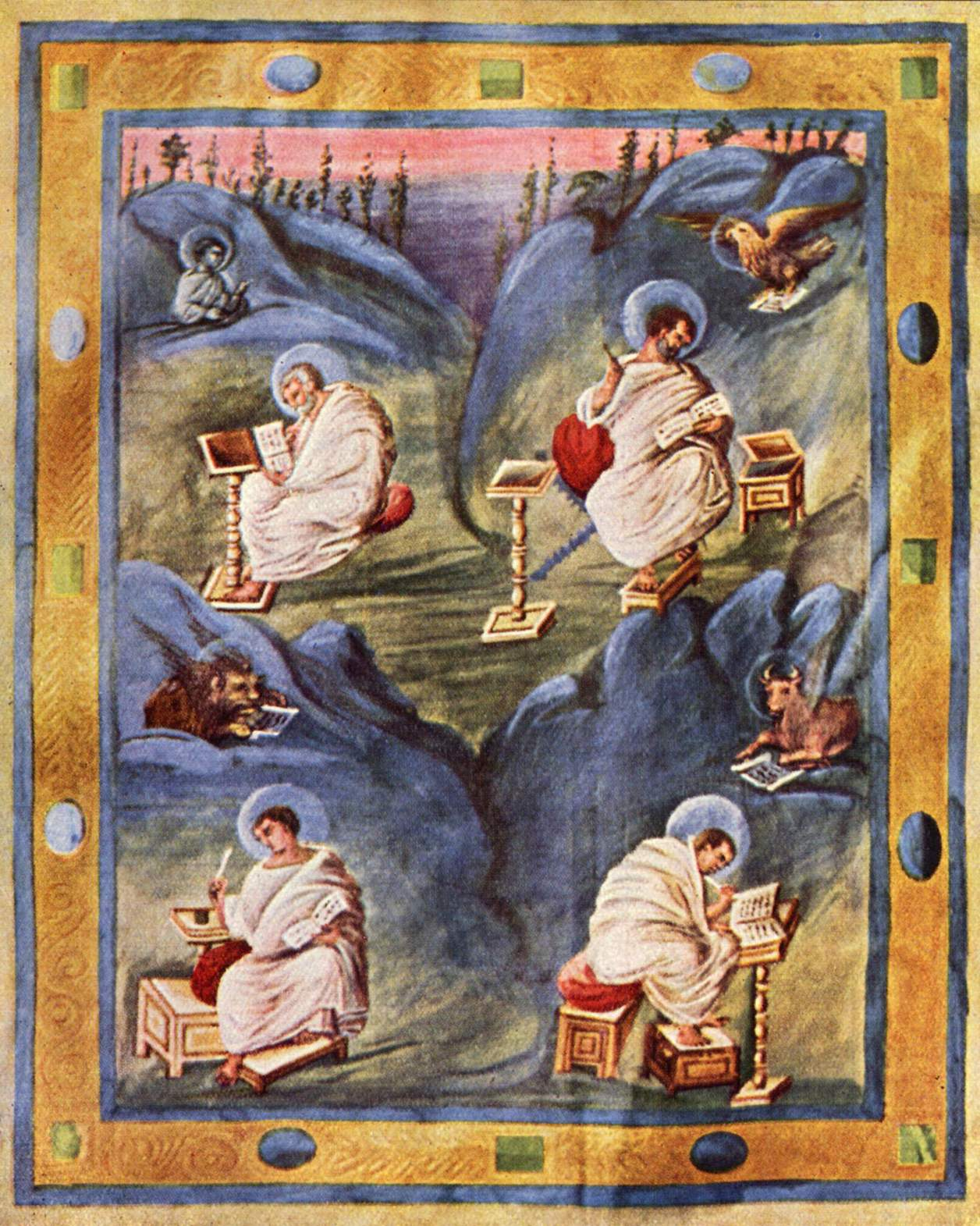
Treasury Gospels, fol. 14v: The Four Evangelists

The Aachen Gospels (German: Schatzkammer-Evangeliar "Treasury Gospels", or Karolingisches Evangeliar "Carolingian Gospels") are a Carolingian illuminated manuscript which was created at the beginning of the ninth century by a member of the Ada School. The Evangeliary belongs to a manuscript group which is referred to as the Ada Group or Group of the Vienna Coronation Gospels. It is part of the church treasury of Charlemagne's Palatine Chapel, now Aachen Cathedral, and is today kept in the Aachen Cathedral Treasury. The Treasury Gospels and the more recent Ottonian Liuthar Gospels are the two most significant medieval manuscripts on display there.

== Description and classification ==
=== Manuscript ===
The codex, with a format of 30.1 cm × 23.3 cm (11.9 in × 9.2 in) on 280 parchment leaves, contains the texts of the four Gospels (each with its prologue), the prologue of Jerome (fol. 2r – fol. 5r) and the so-called summary of Damasus. They are all written in a single column of Carolingian minuscule, with titles and headings emphasised by the use of Capitalis rustica. A full page miniature (fol. 14v) and twelve pages of canon tables as a concordance (fol. 8v – 14r) precede the gospel texts. These are surrounded by architectural decoration, which reflects a late antique model from around AD 400 and, uniquely in all Carolingian illumination, depicts Classical entablatures.

It is very usual, among other things, for showing the Four Evangelists on a side in a hilly landscape with a horizon, which creates the illusion of each of the four being in his own room. The landscape lines the horizon line with shadowy, almost silhouetted, trees in front of a rosy evening sky. Through the differing transparencies of the paint, sketches are visible which show that an architectural background in the form of crenellated walls was originally planned. The Evangelists are depicted with white halos in different stages of life from youth to old age and also as personifications of the four temperaments, wearing loose white togae in the manner of ancient philosophers. With a writing lectern before him, Matthew is writing, Mark is dipping his nib in its inkwell, Luke is reading and John is meditating on what has been written. The evangelists are facing away from one another and seem to carry out their work in isolation, but within a single ornate frame (depicted as if decorated with filigree and gemstones) and in a uniform landscape, conveying the idea that the four authors serve a single purpose, each in his own way, namely the proclamation of the Word of God and the Kingdom of God. Reference is also made to the unity and consistency of the four gospels, as written evidence and manifestation of the a unified body of belief: the Christian Good News. Thus, the imagery has complex theological significations, as is the case in most Medieval art. The arrangement of the four evangelists in the four corners of the landscape recalls the four cardinal points. Just as, according to Augustine, these four cardinal points could only form the single world together, the four authors could only form the single gospel together. This unique depiction derives from an artist mixing Greco-Italian themes with Late Antique painting.

Excepting the image discussed above and a decorative page with the title of the Gospel of Matthew in gold and silver capitalis rustica on a purple background in an ornamental frame, there are no further miniatures in the manuscript, which is incomplete.

The last pages contain the Capitulare Evangeliorum, a list of gospel verses to read at Sunday services and high feasts (fol. 258r).

=== Cover ===
Until 1972 a book cover from Ottonian times (c.1020) with goldsmithery and a Byzantine ivory relief from the late tenth century with a depiction of Mary holding Baby Jesus in the centre was bound to the manuscript. This cover probably belonged to an altarpiece donated by Emperor Henry II, to whom the Pala d'Oro in Aachen Cathedral is also attributed.

The centre of the cover is an ivory panel, showing the Theotokos as Hodegetria (Way-pointer), one of the five main iconographic types of the Madonna in Eastern Orthodox art. She indicates Christ as the Messiah. The relief is the midpoint of ridges with gemstones and Cloisonné extending in horizontal and vertical axes to form a Crux gemmata. The Hodegetria is framed above and below by four gold sheets in Repoussé relief with scenes from the Life of Christ: the Nativity, the Crucifixion, the Resurrection, and the Ascension. The four Evangelists' symbols appear on the left and right of these scenes, at about a third the size of the scenes from the Life of Christ, in golden Repoussé. These eight reliefs are stylistically very similar to those of the Pala d'Oro in Aachen Cathedral, so they were most likely created by a single goldsmithery, probably in Fulda. The outer area of the cover contains a wide trimming, richly decorated with gemstones and filigree

In its layout, the book cover stands in the tradition of Carolingian illumination. Probably, this Ottonian book cover replaced an older Carolingian cover. Chronologically and stylistically, it is closest to that of the Codex aureus Epternacensis.

In the nineteenth century, the binding was redone. At that time, the gold relief was pushed in and as a result the symbols of Matthew and Mark were swapped.

== Bibliography ==
- Frauke Steenbock. Der kirchliche Prachteinband im frühen Mittelalter. Deutscher Verlag für Kunstwissenschaft, Berlin 1965, pp. 133–135.
- Herta Lepie, Georg Minkenberg. Die Schatzkammer des Aachener Domes. Brimberg, Aachen 1995, ISBN 3-923773-16-1, pp. 19–20.
- Katharina Bierbrauer. "Schatzkammer-Evangeliar." In 799. Kunst und Kultur der Karolingerzeit. Katalog der Ausstellung Paderborn 1999. Zabern, Mainz 1999, ISBN 3-8053-2456-1, 2 Volumes, pp. 706–710.
- Kunibert Bering. Kunst des frühen Mittelalters. (= Kunst-Epochen 2). Reclam, Stuttgart 2002, ISBN 3-15-018169-0, pp. 251–254.
- Herta Lepie, Ann Münchow. Elfenbeinkunst aus dem Aachener Domschatz. Imhof, Petersberg 2006, ISBN 3-86568-000-3, pp. 18–21.
