= Codex Aureus of Saint Emmeram =

9th-century illuminated Gospel Book

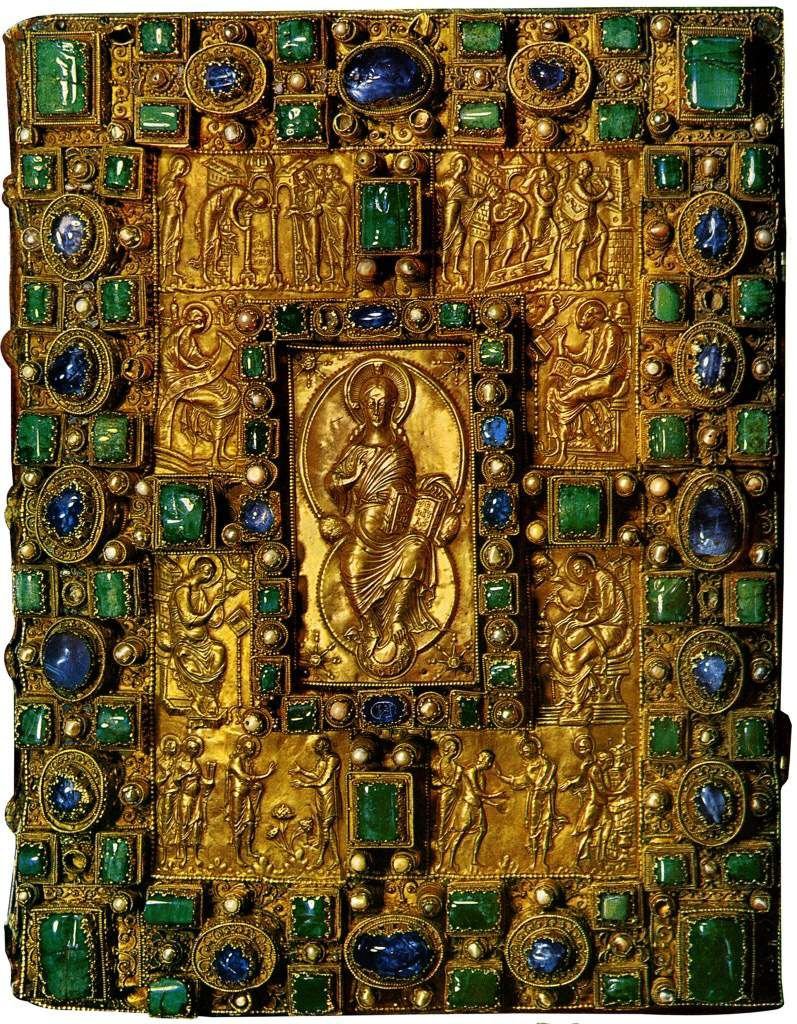
Gem-encrusted cover of the Codex Aureus of Saint Emmeram

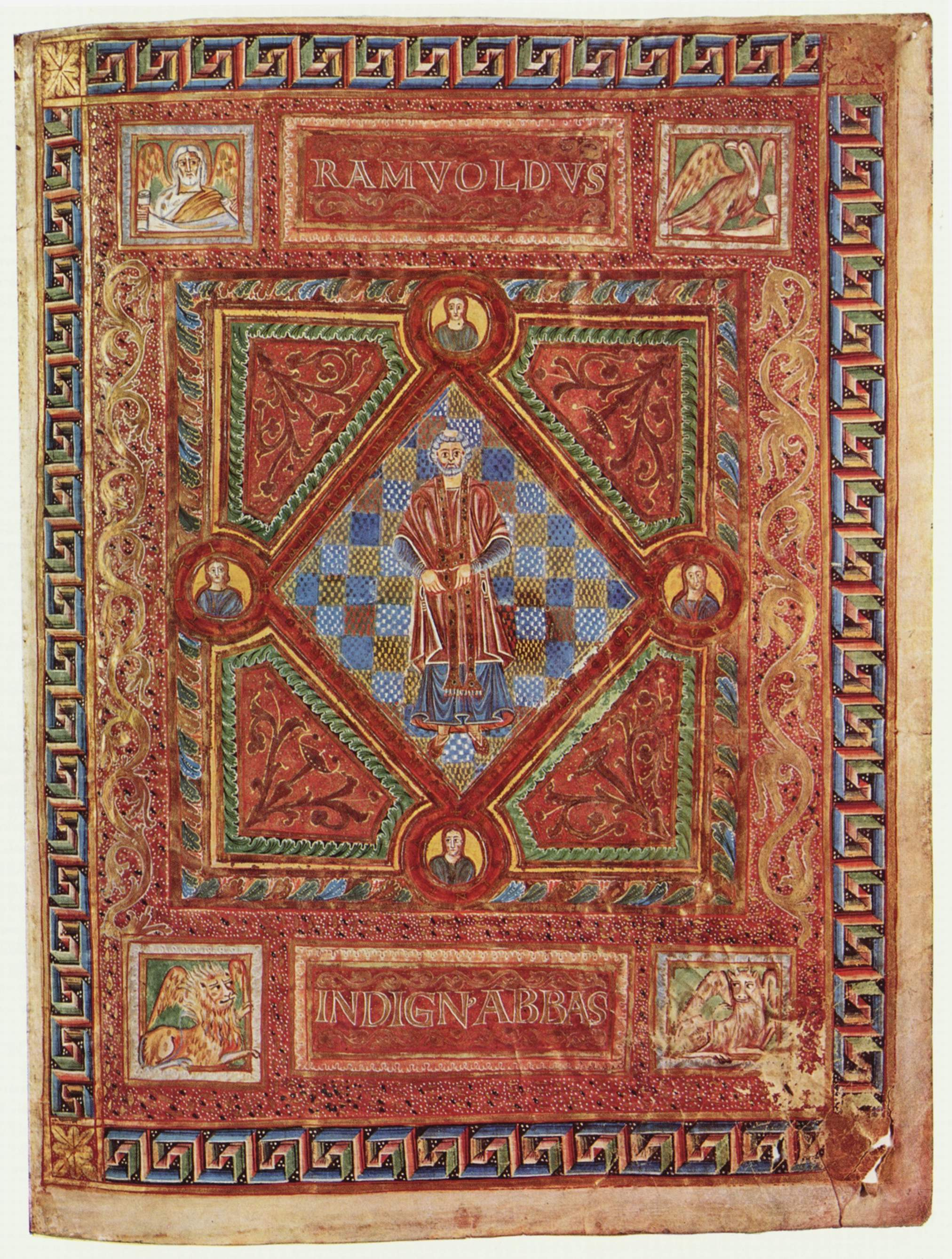
Page with portrait of Abbot Ramwod

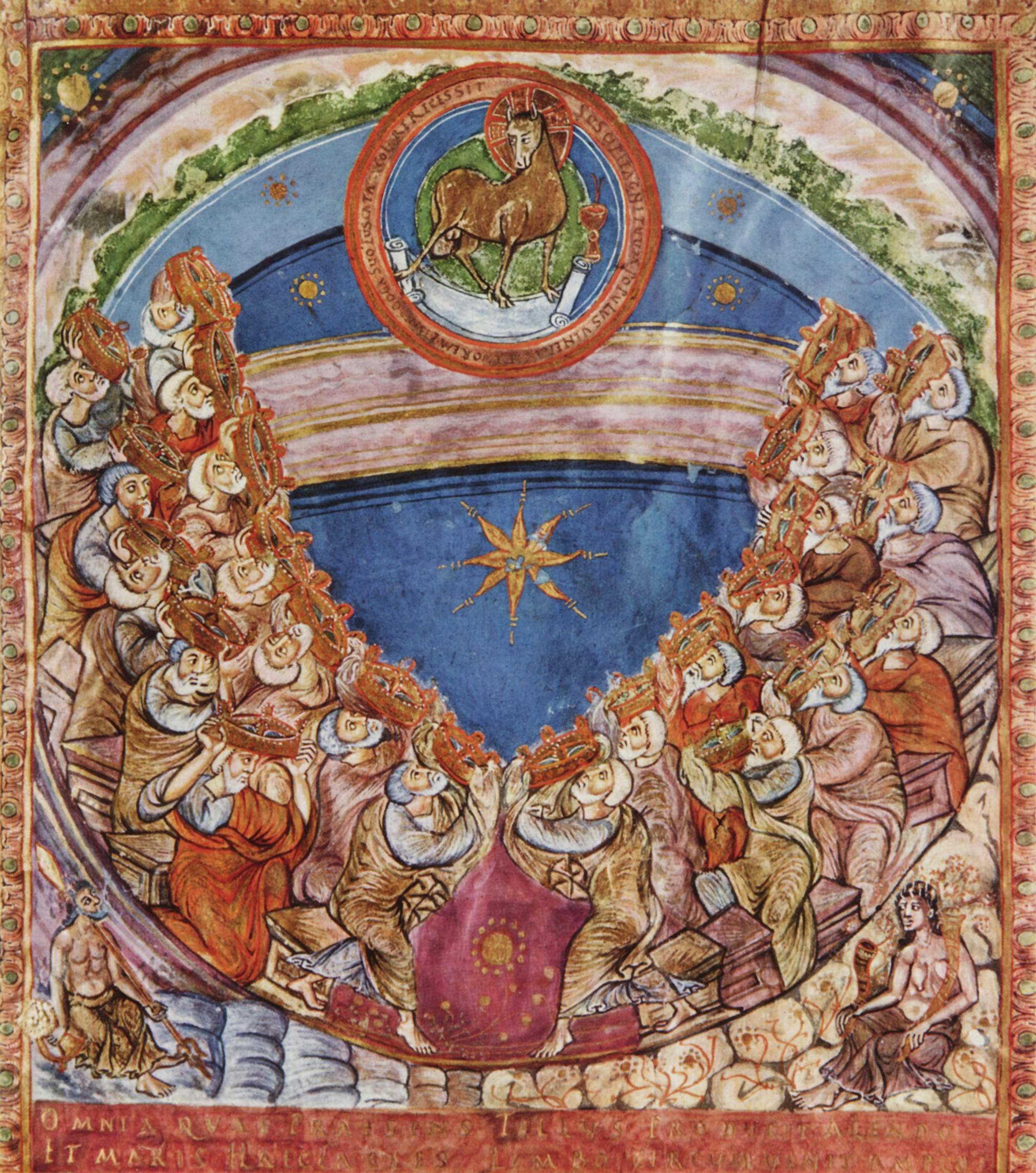
The adoration of the Lamb from the Codex Aureus of Saint Emmeram

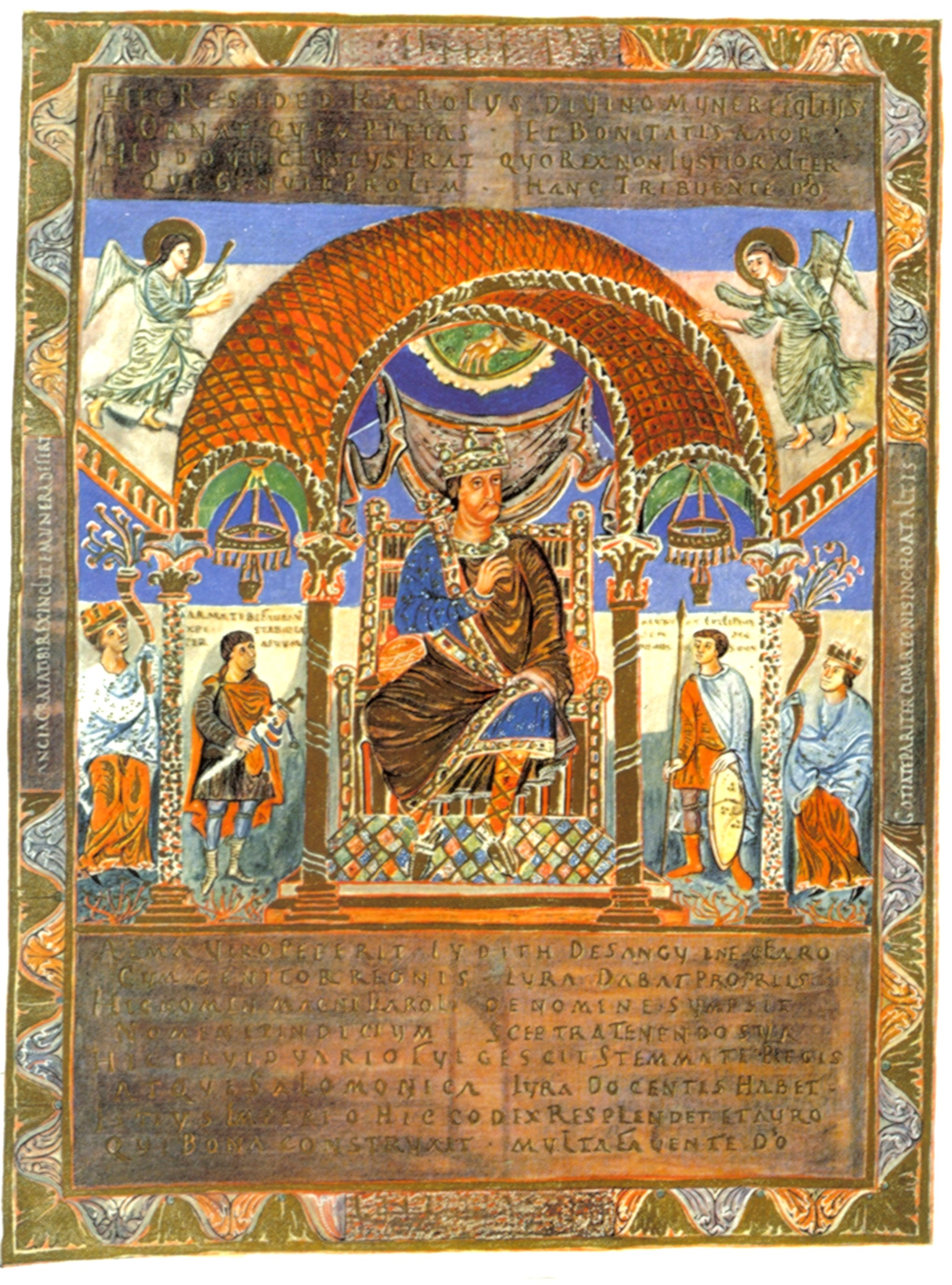
Charles the Bald

The Codex Aureus of Saint Emmeram (Munich, Bayerische Staatsbibliothek, Clm 14000) is a 9th-century illuminated Gospel Book. It takes its name from Saint Emmeram's Abbey in Bavaria, where it was for most of its history (named after Emmeram of Regensburg) and is lavishly illuminated. The cover of the codex is decorated with gems and relief figures in gold, can be precisely dated to 870, and is an important example of Carolingian art, as well as one of very few surviving treasure bindings of this date.

The upper cover of the Lindau Gospels is probably a product of the same workshop, though there are differences of style. This workshop is associated with the Holy Roman Emperor Charles II (the Bald), and often called his "Palace School". Its location (if it had a fixed one) remains uncertain and much discussed, but Saint-Denis Abbey outside Paris is one leading possibility. The Arnulf Ciborium (a miniature architectural ciborium rather than the vessel for hosts), now in the Munich Residenz, is the third major work in the group, along with the frame of an antique serpentine dish in the Louvre. Recent scholars tend to group the Lindau Gospels and the Arnulf Ciborium in closer relation to each other than the Codex Aureus to either.

== History ==
It was produced for the Holy Roman Emperor Charles the Bald in 870 at his Carolingian Palace School. It is not known for certain where the Palace School was then based (after its previous base at St Martin's Abbey in Tours was destroyed in 853), but it had probably moved to the Basilica of St Denis outside Paris by the time of the Codex Aureus's production. Charles gave it to Arnulf of Carinthia. 11th century sources state it was produced in 893 and given to Emperor Arnulf of Carinthia, who in turn donated it to Saint Emmeram's Abbey, then under abbot Tuto. On secularisation in 1811 it was given to the Bayerische Staatsbibliothek in Munich (catalogue reference Clm 14000).

== Content ==
It was written out by the monks Liuthard and Beringer. Seven full-page miniatures show the four evangelists, Charles the Bald enthroned, the Adoration of the Lamb and a Christ in Majesty. It also includes twelve canon tables, ten illuminated initials and incipits. The text is written in golden uncial letters, with each page framed. It measures 420 mm (17 in) by 330 mm (13 in) and has 126 vellum folios.

The cover is handmade of gold, and decorated with precious gemstones, sapphires, emeralds, and pearls. At the centre of the cover appears Christ in Majesty, in repoussé relief, seated on the globe of the world and holding on his knee a book inscribed with the words: "I am the way, and the truth, and the life. No man cometh to the Father, but by me." The inclusion of this inscription again identifies the Gospel Book with Christ. The verse makes equal sense if we read the speaker as Christ or as the Gospel Book. Surrounding Christ outside a frame are four seated evangelist portraits, above or below each of which is a scene from their Gospel. Reading from top left, clockwise, these are: Christ and the Adulterous Woman, the Expulsion of the Money-lenders from the Temple, Healing of the Blind Man, Healing of the Leper.

During the Carolingian era, King Charlemagne believed in the spiritual powers of gemstones and minerals, and their magical connection to heaven. He believed sapphires symbolized an image of heaven, heavenly virtues, and eternal life. Charlemagne passed down his interest in the spiritual qualities of gemstones to his grandson, Charles the Bald, who ordered the Codex Aureus and Lindau Gospels to be written in 870. The artisans created the covers with emeralds, sapphires, rubies, garnets, agates, and pearls. The standard of the work is extremely refined, with each of the gems in a setting that rises up from the plane of the cover and is decorated with fine detail. The "claws" holding the gems in place are minutely formed as acanthus leaves; earlier jewelled metalwork usually used plain "claw"-type settings.

According to the Book of Exodus in the Bible, God was in heaven standing on a street paved with sapphires, "And they saw the God of Israel; and there was under his feet as it were a pavement of sapphire stone, like the very heaven for clearness." (Exodus 24: 9-10) The elaborate and costly decoration of the cover is meant to glorify the Word of God.
