= List of key works of Carolingian illumination =

Key works of Carolingian illumination are those Illuminated manuscripts of the Carolingian period which are recognised in art historical scholarship as works of particular artistic significance (especially those included in general overviews).

The first work to be considered Carolingian is the Godescalc Evangelistary, which was created for Charlemagne between 781 and 783. Until this point, Merovingian and Insular illumination had continued without a breach. The developers of Carolingian illumination were the so-called "court school of Charlemagne" at the Palace of Aachen, which created the manuscripts of the "Ada School." Contemporary was the "Palace School" which was probably based in the same place, but whose artists were from Byzantium or Byzantine Italy. The codices of this school are also known as the "group of the Vienna Coronation Gospels" after their most outstanding examples. After the death of Charlemagne, the centre of illumination shifted to Rheims, Tours and Metz. Since the Court School dominated in the time of Charlemagne, it was more influential in later times than the works of the Palace School. The high point of Carolingian illumination came to an end in the late ninth century. In late Carolingian times a Franco-Saxon School developed which incorporated forms from insular illumination, before a new epoch began at the end of the tenth century with the development of Ottonian illumination

== List of manuscripts ==
Image	Name	Date	Location, School	Contents	Inventory #
	Godescalc Evangelistary	between 781 and 783	Aachen (?)	Evangeliary; six full page miniatures, ornamental decorations, initials and borders; written in gold and silver letters on purple-dyed parchment	Paris, Bibliothèque nationale, Ms. nouv. acq. lat. 1203
	Montpellier Psalter	before 788	Mondsee	Psalter; two full page miniatures, 165 large and 2000 small initials	Montpellier, Bibliothèque Interuniversitaire, Section Médicine, Ms. 409
	Ada Gospels	c.790, second part at the beginning of the 9th century	Aachen, Ada School (Court School of Charlemagne)	Evangeliary	Trier, Stadtbibliothek, Cod. 22
	Saint-Martin-des-Champs Gospels or Paris Arsenal-Gospels	c. 790	Aachen, Ada School (Court School of Charlemagne)	Evangeliary	Paris, Bibliothèque de l'Arsenal, Ms. 599
	Dagulf Psalter	before 795	Aachen, Ada School (Court School of Charlemagne)	Psalter	Vienna, Austrian National Library, Ms. 1861
	St. Riquier Gospels, or Centula Gospels, or Abbeville Gospels	End of the eight century	Aachen, Ada School (Court School of Charlemagne)	Evangeliary	Abbeville, Bibliothèque municipale, Ms. 4
	Vienna Coronation Gospels or Reich Gospels	shortly before 800	Aachen (?), Vienna Coronation Gospels Group ("Palace School of Charlemagne")	Evangeliary; four full-page images of the Evangelists, 16 Canon tables; written with gold and silver letter on purple-dyed parchment	Vienna, Kunsthistorisches Museum, Schatzkammer Inv. XIII 18
	Livinius Gospels	c.800	Saint-Amand Abbey (?)	Evangeliary; 18 Canon tables, two images of the Evangelists (originally four); Incipit and initial pages	Ghent, Sint-Baafskapittel, Ms. 13
	Charlemagne Gospels	c.800	Aachen, around the Court School of Charlemagne	Evangeliary	Munich, Universitätsbibliothek München, Cim. 1 (= 2° Cod. ms. 29)
	Hiltfred Gospels	801/825	France	Evangeliary	Cologne, Cologne Diocesan Library, Dom Hs. 13
	Aachen Gospels or Schatzkammer Gospels or Carolingian Gospels	Beginning of the 9th century	Aachen (?), Vienna Coronation Gospels Group ("Palace School of Charlemagne")	Evangeliary	Aachen, Cathedral Treasury, Inv.-Nr. 4
	Xanten Gospels	Beginning of the 9th century	Aachen (?), Vienna Coronation Gospels Group ("Palace School of Charlemagne")	Evangeliary	Brussels, Royal Library of Belgium, Ms. 18732
	Gospels of Aachen	Anfang des 9. Jahrhunderts	Aachen (?), Vienna Coronation Gospels Group ("Palace School of Charlemagne")	Evangeliary	Brescia, Biblioteca Queriniana, Ms. E. II.9
	London Gospel fragment	Anfang 9. Jahrhundert	Aachen, Ada School (Court School of Charlemagne)	A single miniature depicting Luke 1.8-13	London, British Library, Cotton Clausius B.V.
	Trier Apocalypse	first quarter of the 9th century	West Francia	Apokalypse; 74 illustrations	Trier, Stadtbibliothek, Cod. 31
	Codex Aureus of Lorsch	c.810	Aachen, Ada School (Court School of Charlemagne)	Evangeliary; six full-page miniatures, 12 Canon tables; written in gold and silver letters on purple-dyed parchment	Bucharest, National Library of Romania; Vatican City, Vatican Library, Pal. lat. 50
	Harley Golden Gospels	c.800	Aachen, Ada School (Court School of Charlemagne)	Evangeliary	London, British Library, Harley Ms. 2788
	Ebbo Gospels	between 816 and 835	Rheims	Evangeliary	Épernay, Bibliothèque Municipale, Ms. 1
	Stuttgart Psalter	between 820 and 830	Saint-Germain-des-Prés	Psalter	Stuttgart, Württembergische Landesbibliothek, Cod. bibl. fol. 23
	Utrecht Psalter	c. 825	Rheims	Psalter; 166 line drawings	Utrecht, Academic Library, Ms. 484
	Vatican Agrimensorum codex	c.825	Aachen (?)	Text on surveying	Vatican City, Vatican Library, Pal. lat. 1564
	Vatican Terence	c.825	Aachen (?)	Terence: Comedies; over 130 illustrations	Vatican City, Vatican Library, Vat. lat. 3868
	Bern Physiologus	between 825 and 850	Rheims	Physiologus; 25 framed and 10 unframed miniatures	Bern, Burgerbibliothek, Codex Bongarsianus 318
	Fleury Gospels	between 825 and 850	Fleury	Evangeliary	Bern, Burgerbibliothek, Codex 348
	Psalter of Louis the German	second quarter of the 9th century	Saint-Omer	Psalter	Berlin, State Library, Ms. theol. lat. fol. 58
	Gospels of St. Medard de Soissons	before 827	Aachen, Ada School (Court School of Charlemagne)	Evangeliary; Six full-page miniatures and 12 canon tables; written with gold and silver letters on purple-dyed parchment	Paris, Bibliothèque nationale, Ms. lat. 8850
	Leiden Aratea	between 830 and 840	Lotharingia (Aachen or Metz)	Latin verse translation of Aratus' Phainomena by Germanicus with additions from Avienius' translation; 35 full-page miniatures (four images missing)	Leiden, Leiden University Library, Voss. lat. Q 79
	Bamberg Bible	between 834 and 843	Tours	Bible	Bamberg, State Library, Msc.Bibl.1
	Moutier-Grandval Bible	c.840	Tours	Bible; four full-page miniatures	London, British Library, Add. Ms. 10546
	Codex Vaticanus Reginensis latinus 124	c. 840	Fulda	Rabanus Maurus: De laudibus sanctae crucis	Vatican, Vatican Library, Reg. lat. 124
	Fuldaer Evangeliar	c.840	Fulda	Evangeliary	Würzburg, Universitätsbibliothek Würzburg, Mp. theol. fol. 66
	Madrid Handbook of 809	c.840	Metz	Handbook of 809; 52 illustrations of the constellations	Madrid, Biblioteca Nacional de España, Cod. 3307
	Drogo Sacramentary	842	Metz	Sacramentary; 41 historicising initials	Paris, Bibliothèque nationale, Ms. lat. 9428
	Lothar Psalter	842–855	Aachen?	Psalter	London, British Library, Add. MS 37768
	Bamberger Boethius	c.845	Tours	Boethius: De institutione arithmetica libri II	Bamberg, State Library, Msc.Class.5
Karl der Kahle (Bible de Vivien, dite Première Bible de Charles le Chauve Présentation du livre à l'empereur Saint-Martin de Tours, 845 BnF, Manuscrits, Latin 1 fol. 423).jpg	First Bible of Charles the Bald or Vivian Bible	845/846	Tours	Bible; eight full-page miniatures, four canon tables, 87 initials	Paris, Bibliothèque nationale, Ms. lat. 1
	Prayer book of Charles the Bald	between 846 and 869	Court School of Charles the Bald	Oldest royal prayer book; two full-page miniatures, one full-page decorative initial	Munich, Treasury of the Residenz, ResMü. Schk0004-WL
	Lothaire Gospels	between 849 and 851	Tours	Evangeliary; six miniatures, nine framed incipit pages, twelve canon tables, 18 framed chapter indices, and five initials.	Paris, Bibliothèque nationale, Ms. lat. 266
	Prüm Gospels	c.850	Tours	Evangeliary; five miniature, initials, canon tables, frames	Berlin, State Library, Ms. theol. lat. fol. 733
	Cleves Evangeliary	before 852	Aachen, Court School of Emperor Lothair	Evangeliar	Berlin, State Library, Ms. theol. Lat. folio 260
	Paris Terence	second half of the ninth century	Rheims	Terence: Comodies; 148 illustrations	Paris, Bibliothèque nationale, Ms. lat. 7899
	Gospels of Francis II	second half of the ninth century	Saint-Amand	Evangeliary	Paris, Bibliothèque nationale, Ms. lat. 257
	Gospels of St. Denis	second half of the ninth century	north or north east France	Evangeliary	Paris, Bibliothèque nationale, Ms. lat. 9387
	Golden Psalter of St. Gallen	begun c. 860 and continued from 870 to 900	St. Denis (?) (Court School of Charles the Bald), later continued at St. Gall	Psalter; two full-page miniatures, 15 full or half page illustrations on the Psalm titles	St. Gall, Abbey Library, Cod. Sang. 22
	Düsseldorf, Universitäts- und Landesbibliothek, B. 113	second third of the 9th century	Rheims	Evangeliary	Düsseldorf, University and State Library, B. 113
	Bern Prudentius	last third of the 9th century	Reichenau (?)	Prudentius: Poetry	Bern, Burgerbibliothek, Codex Bongarsianus 264
	Psalter of Charles the Bald	after 869	St. Denis (?) (Court School of Charles the Bald)	Psalter	Paris, Bibliothèque Nationale, Ms. lat. 1152
	Sacramentary of Charles the Bald or Metz Sacramentary	c. 870	Metz or St. Denis (?) (Court School of Charles the Bald)	Sakramentary (Fragment, 10 leaves); five full-page miniatures and two initial pages	Paris, Bibliothèque nationale, Ms. lat. 1141
	Codex Aureus of St. Emmeram	c. 870	St. Denis (?) (Court School of Charles the Bald)	Sacramentary; seven full-page miniatures, 12 canon tables, 10 ornamental pages	Munich, Bavarian State Library, Clm 14000
	Bible of San Paolo fuori le Mura or Bible of Charles the Bald	c. 870	St. Denis (?) (Court School of Charles the Bald)	Bible; 24 (originally 25) title miniatures, four canon tables, 35 decorative pages, 91 initials; written in gold and silver letters on purple-dyed parchment	Rome, San Paolo fuori le mura, Cod. Membra. Saeculi IX.
	Folchard Psalter	c.870	St. Gall	Psalter	St. Gall, Abbey Library, Cod. Sang. 23
	Second Bible of Charles the Bald	between 871 and 873	St. Amand	Bible	Paris, Bibliothèque nationale, Ms. lat. 2
	Prague Gospels	late 9th century	St. Vaast	Evangeliar; 15 canon tables, eight miniatures, framed incipit and initial pages	Prague, Kapitulni Knihovna, Cim. 2

== Bibliography ==
- Florentine Mütherich, Joachim E. Gaehde: Karolingische Buchmalerei. Prestel, München 1979. ISBN 3-7913-0395-3
- Hermann Fillitz: "Propyläen–Kunstgeschichte," Vol 5: Das Mittelalter 1. Propyläen–Verlag, Berlin 1990. ISBN 3-549-05105-0
- Hans Holländer: "Die Entstehung Europas," in: Belser Stilgeschichte, Studienausgabe, Vol 2, edited by Christoph Wetzel, pp. 153–384. Belser, Stuttgart 1993 [on illumination pp. 241–255]
- Christoph Stiegemann, Matthias Wemhoff: 799. Kunst und Kultur der Karolingerzeit. Katalog der Ausstellung Paderborn 1999, Verlag Philipp von Zabern, Mainz 1999. ISBN 3-8053-2456-1
- Kunibert Bering: Kunst des frühen Mittelalters (Kunst–Epochen, Vol. 2). Reclam, Stuttgart 2002. ISBN 3-15-018169-0
- Ingo F. Walther, Norbert Wolf: Meisterwerke der Buchmalerei. Taschen, Köln. 2005, ISBN 3-8228-4747-X
- Peter van den Brink, Sarvenaz Ayooghi (Hrsg.): Karl der Große – Charlemagne. Karls Kunst. Katalog der Sonderausstellung Karls Kunst vom 20. Juni bis 21. September 2014 im Centre Charlemagne, Aachen. Sandstein, Dresden 2014, ISBN 978-3-95498-093-2 (on illumination passim).
