= Cambrai Apocalypse =

The dragon and the woman of the Apocalypse (folio 27r)

The Cambrai Apocalypse (shelfmark Cambrai, Bibliothèque municipale, MS 386) is an illuminated manuscript of the Latin text of the Book of Revelation. It has been in Cambrai since the 10th century, when it was catalogued in the library of Cambrai Cathedral.

The Cambrai Apocalypse was probably produced somewhere in northern France in the 10th century. Today the manuscript is missing 27 folios, yet still contains 46 full-page miniatures drawn in ink with a quill and painted by brush in watercolours. These are copied in detail from the 9th-century Trier Apocalypse, which iself made use of an early Christian model. The scrolls depicted in the Trier manuscript, based on its ancient model, are sometimes updated to codices in the Cambrai Apocalypse.

== Bibliography ==
- Cinato, Franck; Klein, Peter; Laforge, Fabien, eds. (2017). Die Apocalypse von Cambrai. Ms. B 386 Cambrai Médiathèque d'Agglomération: Kommentar sur Faksimile-Edition. Quaternio-Verlag.
- Snyder, James (1964). "The Reconstruction of an Early Christian Cycle of Illustrations for the Book of Revelation: The Trier Apocalypse". Vigiliae Christianae. 18 (3): 146–162. doi:10.2307/1582090. JSTOR 1582090.
