= Northern Renaissance =

Renaissance that occurred in the European countries north of the Alps

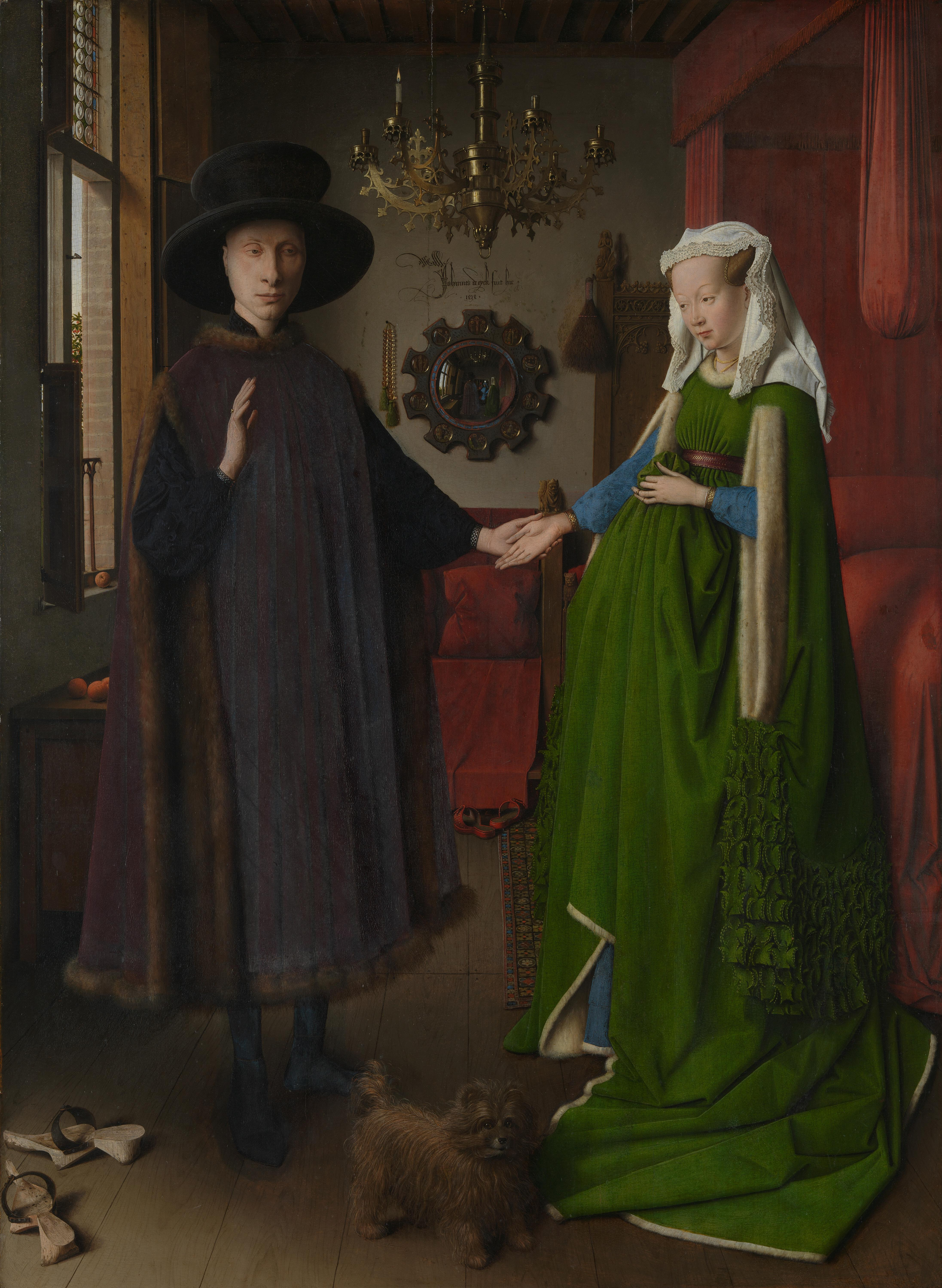
Jan van Eyck, The Arnolfini Portrait, 1434, National Gallery, London. An Italian merchant based in Bruges in modern Belgium

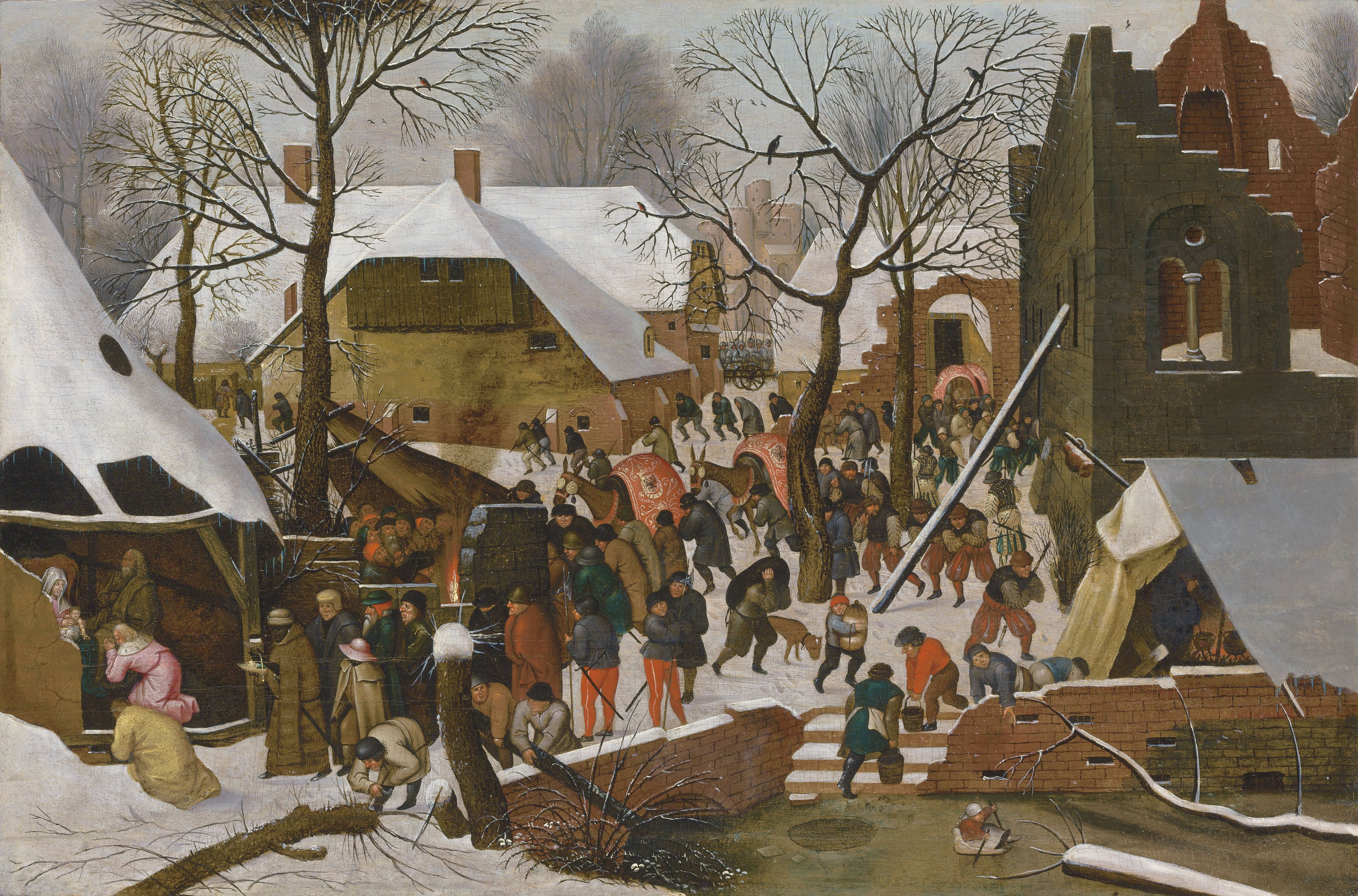
The Adoration of the Magi in the snow, Pieter Brueghel the Younger, 1584–1638

The Northern Renaissance was a cultural awakening or boom that occurred in Europe north of the Alps, developing later than the Italian Renaissance, and in most respects only beginning in the last years of the 15th century. It took different forms in the various countries involved, and the German, French, English, Low Countries and Polish Renaissances often had different characteristics. Northern Renaissanse is also called Arts Nova as strictly speaking there was no equivalent ancient flourishing of art north of the Alps that could undergo a 'rebirth'.

Early Netherlandish painting, especially its later phases, is often classified as part of the Northern Renaissance. Rapidly expanding trade and commerce and a new class of rich merchant patrons in then Burgundian cities like Bruges in the 15th century and Antwerp in the 16th increased cultural exchange between Italy and the Low Countries; however in art, and especially architecture, late Gothic influences remained present until the arrival of Baroque even as painters increasingly drew on Italian models.

In France, King Francis I imported Italian Renaissance art, and commissioned Italian artists (including Leonardo da Vinci), building grand palaces at great expense, starting the French Renaissance. In England also, the first signs of Renaissance art and architecture were the result of patronage by a small circle of patrons at the royal courts of Henry VII of England and his son Henry VIII (Nonsuch Palace), and courtiers such as Cardinal Thomas Wolsey, who built Hampton Court Palace.

Universities and the printed book helped spread the spirit of the age through France, the Low Countries and the Holy Roman Empire, and then to Scandinavia and Britain in the early 16th century. Writers and humanists such as Rabelais, Pierre de Ronsard and Desiderius Erasmus were greatly influenced by the Italian Renaissance model and were part of the same intellectual movement. During the English Renaissance (which overlapped with the Elizabethan era) writers such as William Shakespeare and Christopher Marlowe composed works of lasting influence. The Renaissance was brought to Poland directly from Italy by artists from Florence and the Low Countries, starting the Polish Renaissance.

In some areas the Northern Renaissance was distinct from the Italian Renaissance in its centralization of political power. While Italy and Germany were dominated by independent city-states, most of Europe began emerging as nation-states or even unions of countries. The Northern Renaissance was also closely linked to the Protestant Reformation with the resulting long series of internal and external conflicts between various Protestant groups and the Catholic Church having lasting effects.

== Overview ==
Feudalism was on the decline at the beginning of the Renaissance. The reasons for this decline include the post-Plague environment, the increasing use of money rather than land as a medium of exchange, the growing number of serfs living as freemen, the formation of nation-states with monarchies interested in reducing the power of feudal lords, the increasing uselessness of feudal armies in the face of new military technology (such as gunpowder), and a general increase in agricultural productivity due to improving farming technology and methods. As in Italy, the decline of feudalism opened the way for the cultural, social, and economic changes associated with the Renaissance in Europe.

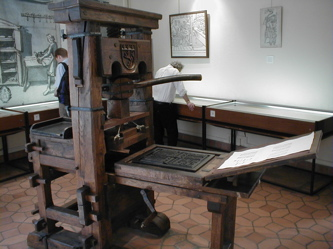
Reproduction of Johannes Gutenberg-era Press on display at the Printing History Museum in Lyon, France.

The velocity of transmission of the Renaissance throughout Europe can also be ascribed to the invention of the printing press. Its power to disseminate information enhanced scientific research, spread political ideas and generally impacted the course of the Renaissance in northern Europe. As in Italy, the printing press increased the availability of books written in both vernacular languages and the publication of new and ancient classical texts in Greek and Latin. Furthermore, the Bible became widely available in translation, a factor often attributed to the spread of the Protestant Reformation.

== Age of Discovery ==
One of the most important technological development of the Renaissance was the invention of the caravel. This combination of European and North African ship building technologies for the first time made extensive trade and travel over the Atlantic feasible. While first introduced by the Italian states and the early captains, such as Giovanni Caboto, Giovanni da Verrazzano and Columbus, who were Italian explorers, the development would end Northern Italy's role as the trade crossroads of Europe, shifting wealth and power westwards to Portugal, Spain, France, England, and the Netherlands. These states all began to conduct extensive trade with Africa and Asia, and in the Americas began extensive colonisation activities. This period of exploration and expansion has become known as the Age of Discovery. Eventually European power spread around the globe.

== Painting and sculpture ==
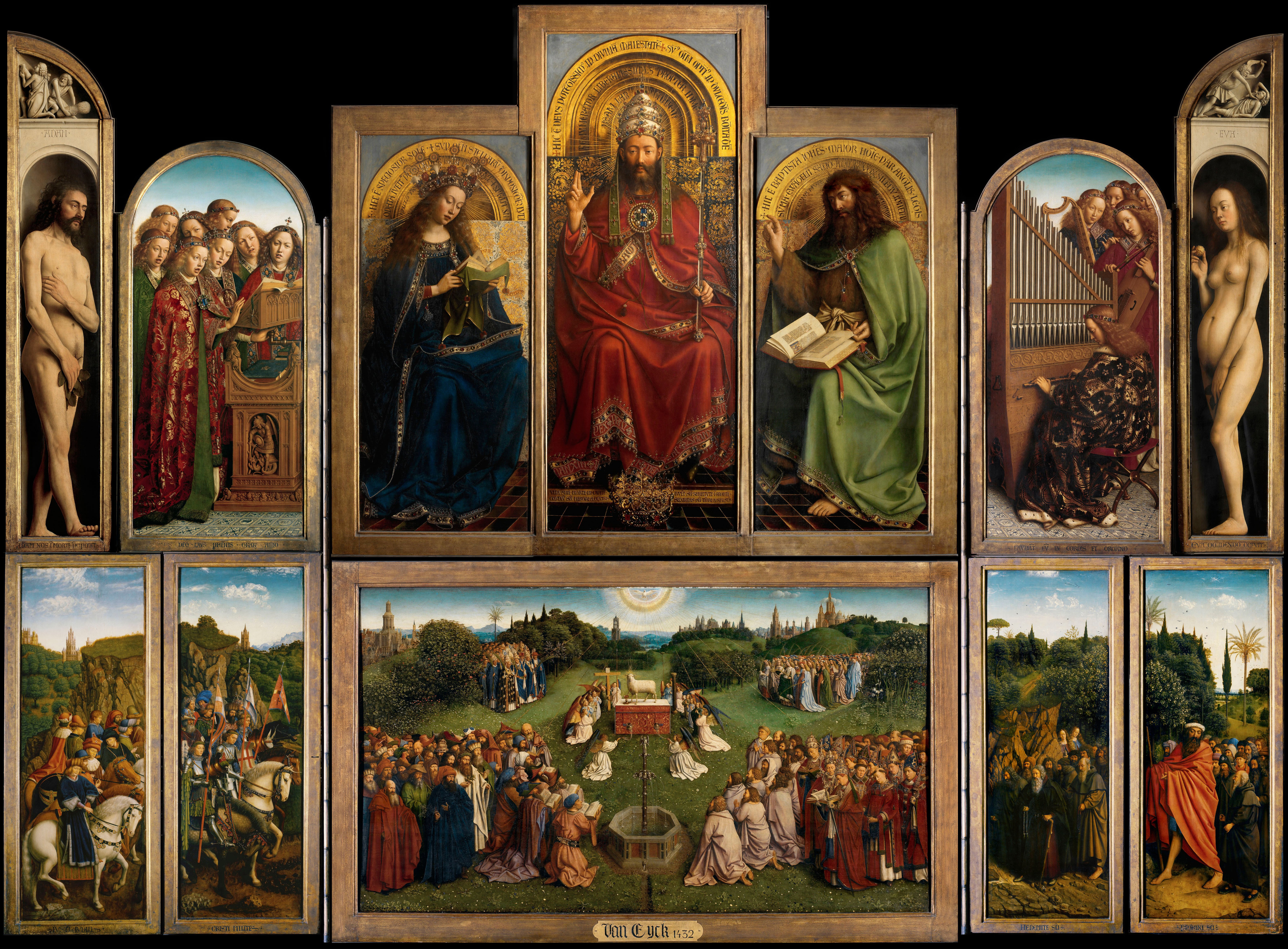
The Ghent Altarpiece (interior view) by Hubert and Jan van Eyck, completed 1432. Saint Bavo Cathedral, Ghent, Belgium.

Early Netherlandish painting often included complicated iconography, and art historians have debated the "hidden symbolism" of works by artists like Hubert and Jan van Eyck.

The detailed realism of Early Netherlandish painting, led by Robert Campin and Jan van Eyck in the 1420s and 1430s, is today generally considered to be the beginning of the early Northern Renaissance in painting. This detailed realism was greatly respected in Italy, but there was little reciprocal influence on the North until nearly the end of the 15th century. Despite frequent cultural and artistic exchange, the Antwerp Mannerists (1500–1530)—chronologically overlapping with but unrelated to Italian Mannerism—were among the first artists in the Low Countries to clearly reflect Italian formal developments.

Around the same time, Albrecht Dürer made his two trips to Italy, where he was greatly admired for his prints. Dürer, in turn, was influenced by the art he saw there and is agreed to be one of the first Northern High Renaissance painters. Other notable northern painters such as Hans Holbein the Elder and Jean Fouquet, retained a Gothic influence that was still popular in the north, while highly individualistic artists such as Hieronymus Bosch and Pieter Bruegel the Elder developed styles that were imitated by many subsequent generations. Later in the 16th century Northern painters increasingly looked and travelled to Rome, becoming known as the Romanists. The High Renaissance art of Michelangelo and Raphael and the late Renaissance stylistic tendencies of Mannerism that were in vogue had a great impact on their work.

Renaissance humanism and the large number of surviving classical artworks and monuments encouraged many Italian painters to explore Greco-Roman themes more prominently than northern artists, and likewise the famous 15th-century German and Dutch paintings tend to be religious. In the 16th century, mythological and other themes from history became more uniform amongst northern and Italian artists. Northern Renaissance painters, however, had new subject matter, such as landscape and genre painting.

As Renaissance art styles moved through northern Europe, they changed and were adapted to local customs. In England and the northern Netherlands the Reformation brought religious painting almost completely to an end. Despite several very talented artists of the Tudor Court in England, portrait painting was slow to spread from the elite. In France the School of Fontainebleau was begun by Italians such as Rosso Fiorentino in the latest Mannerist style, but succeeded in establishing a durable national style. By the end of the 16th century, artists such as Karel van Mander and Hendrik Goltzius collected in Haarlem in a brief but intense phase of Northern Mannerism that also spread to Flanders.

== Bibliography ==
- Chipps Smith, Jeffrey (2004). The Northern Renaissance. Phaidon Press. ISBN 978-0-7148-3867-0.
- Campbell, Gordon, ed. (2009). The Grove Encyclopedia of Northern Renaissance Art. Oxford University Press. ISBN 978-0-19-533466-1.

=== Further reading ===
- O'Neill, J, ed. (1987). The Renaissance in the North. New York: The Metropolitan Museum of Art.
- Bezrucka, Yvonne (2017). The Invention of Northern Aesthetics in 18th-Century English Literature. Cambridge Scholars Press. ISBN 978-1-5275-0302-1.
- Snyder, James. Northern Renaissance Art, 1985, Harry N. Abrams, ISBN 0136235964
- Snyder, James, Introduction to The Metropolitan Museum of Art. Vol. 5, The Renaissance in the North, 1987.
