= Ludwig Psalter =

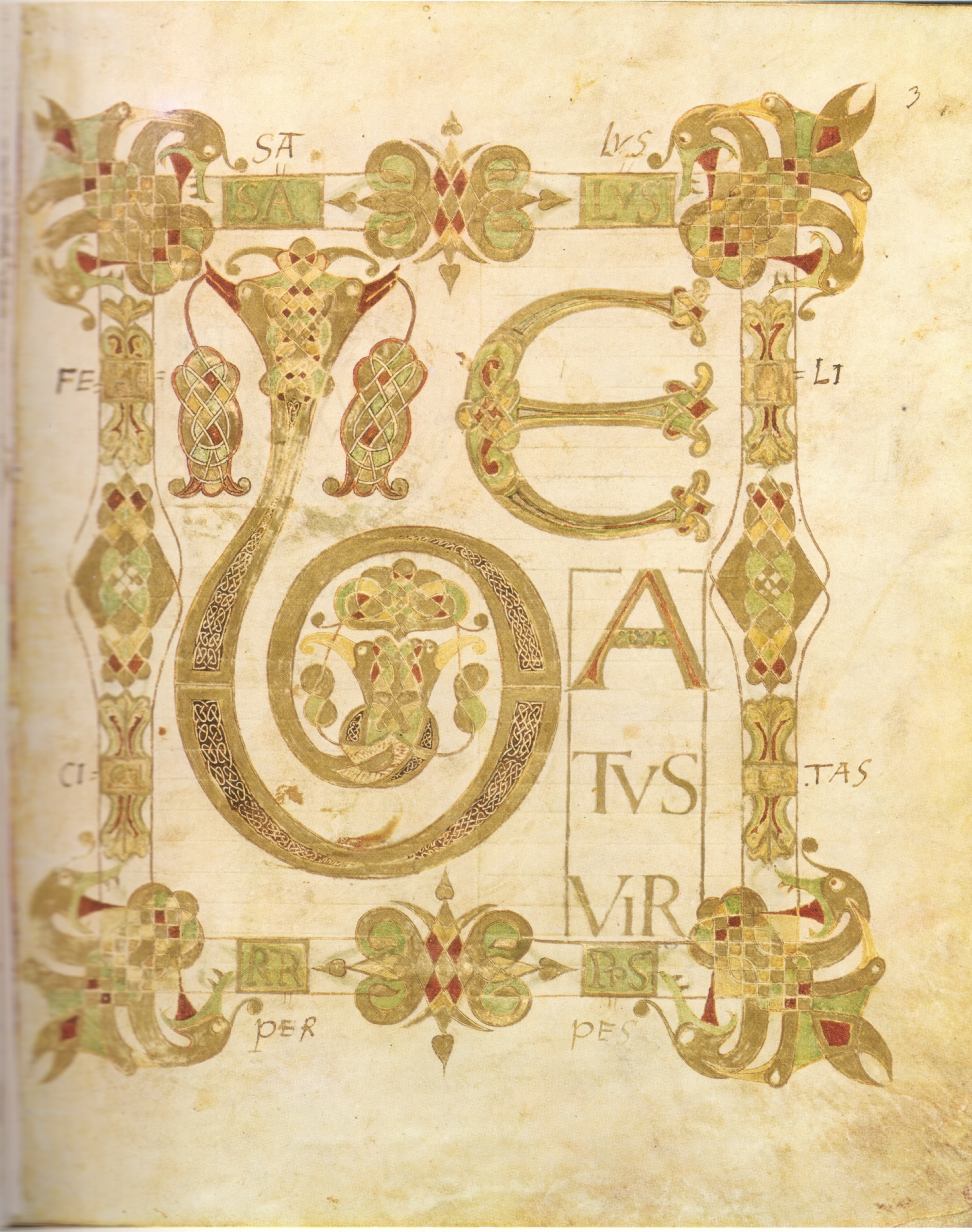
The incipit of Psalm 1—Beatus vir... ("Blessed is the man...")—takes up the whole of folio 3r.

The Ludwig Psalter is an illuminated psalter produced between about 825 and 850 at the Abbey of Saint Bertin. It was made for a King Louis, generally thought to be Louis the German, although Louis the Pious has also been suggested. It is illustrated in the Franco-Saxon style and probably served as Louis's private prayer book. Although kept for a time at the Abbey of Fulda, it is now in the Berlin State Library (shelfmark Theol. lat. fol. 58).

At a later date, a "Prayer to Be Recited Before the Cross" was added to some blank pages at the end (folios 119r–v) of the psalter, along with an illustration of a king before the cross (folio 120r). The style is very similar to that of Otfrid of Wissembourg's Liber evangeliorum, and was probably made about the same time (between 863 and 871) by the same illustrator at Wissembourg Abbey. Eric Goldberg associates it with Louis the German's illness in 869, and interprets the king in the illustration as Louis. Simon MacLean, on the other hand, believes the year was 873 and the king Louis's son, Charles the Fat.

== See also ==
- List of key works of Carolingian illumination

== Bibliography ==
- Goldberg, Eric J. (1999). "'More Devoted to the Equipment of Battle Than the Splendor of Banquets': Frontier Kingship, Military Ritual, and Early Knighthood at the Court of Louis the German". Viator. 30: 41–78. doi:10.1484/j.viator.2.300829.
- Goldberg, Eric J. (2006). Struggle for Empire: Kingship and Conflict under Louis the German, 817–876. Cornell University Press. ISBN 978-0-8014-7529-0.
- Heintzelman, Matthew Z. (2009). "Review ofDer Wolfenbütteler Psalter: Cod. Guelf. 81.17 Aug. 2°: Eine ornamentgeschichtliche Studie by Stefanie Westphal". Mediaevistik. 22: 391–393. JSTOR 42586893.
