= Gospels of Lothair =

Illustrated manuscript

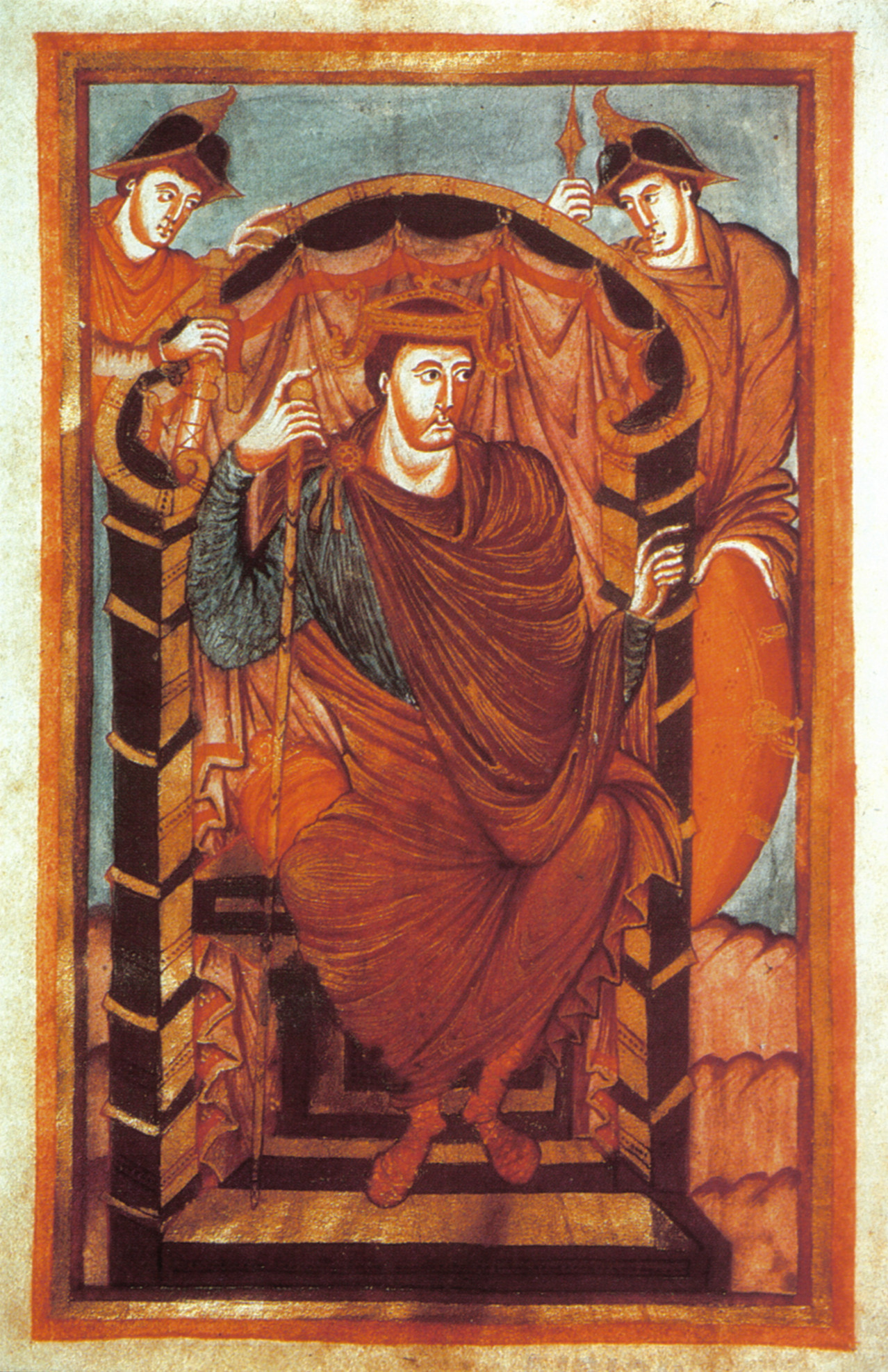
Depiction of Lothair (fol. 1v)

The Gospels of Lothair (BNF Lat. 266) is an Carolingian illuminated evangeliary made for Emperor Lothair I in Saint-Martin de Tours during 849–851. Representing the peak of the Tours workshop, the manuscript has 221 parchment leaves written in gold ink, with six miniatures, nine incipit pages, twelve altar cards, 18 index pages and five initials.

The production of the Gospels of Lothair was overseen by one Sigilaus. The manuscript was completed before the death of Empress Irmingard, who is mentioned in the dedication. It is traditionally dated to after Lothair's reconciliation with his brother, Charles the Bald, in 849, but work on it may have begun as early as 842. It contains the earliest depiction of Lothair and what may be the earliest monarch portrait in a biblical manuscript.

The Gospels of Lothair should not be confused with the Cleves Evangeliary, another gospel book produced for the court of Lothair.

== See also ==
- Key works of Carolingian illumination
