= Trier Apocalypse =

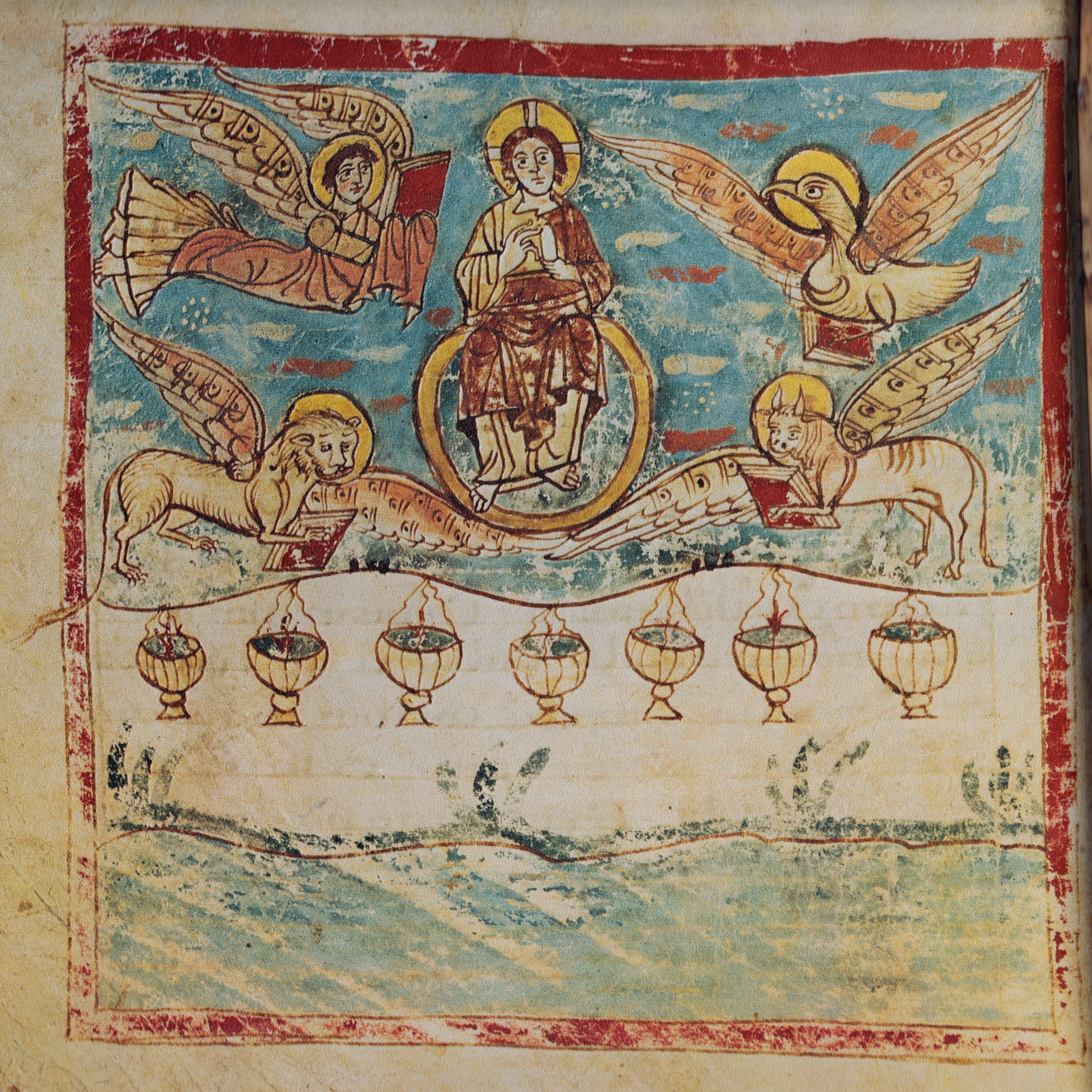
Seven bowls

The Trier Apocalypse is one of the earliest surviving illustrated manuscripts of the biblical Book of Revelation. It is currently manuscript 31 in the Stadtbibliothek Trier. Although produced in the ninth century, its cycle of illustrations is based on ancient Christian models.

An example of Carolingian illumination, the Trier Apocalypse was copied probably in the early ninth century in the north of what is now France. Its original text is an Old Latin version. It was later corrected by a scribe to conform to the Vulgate. The text has 61 divisions.

The Trier Apocalypse contains 74 full-page illustrations within red borders measuring 26.2 by 21.6 centimetres (10.3 in × 8.5 in). They were made with a quill pen and ink, only occasionally augmented by brush with a limited palette of watercolours. They are simultaneously "bold and clear" but "hurried or carless" in execution. As there are 74 illustrations, they do not correspond to the 61 textual divisions. In fact, the illustrations frequently combine different episodes so that a total of 150 episodes are illustrated. At the start of the manuscript, the illustrations are on the verso (back) of the page containing the text they illustrate, but this poor arrangement was corrected so that for most of the manuscript the illustrations, which remain on the verso, correspond to the text on the facing recto.

Several features of the illustrations indicate that they were modelled after an archetype of the 4th–6th centuries. These include the depiction of books as scrolls, soldiers in Roman dress and Christ as the beardless Logos sitting enthroned on the globe of the Earth. The illustrations are uninfluenced by the commentaries on Revelation that began to appear in the eighth century.

The manuscript Cambrai Apocalypse (Bibliothèque municipale, MS 386) is probably a copy of the Trier Apocalypse.

== Gallery ==
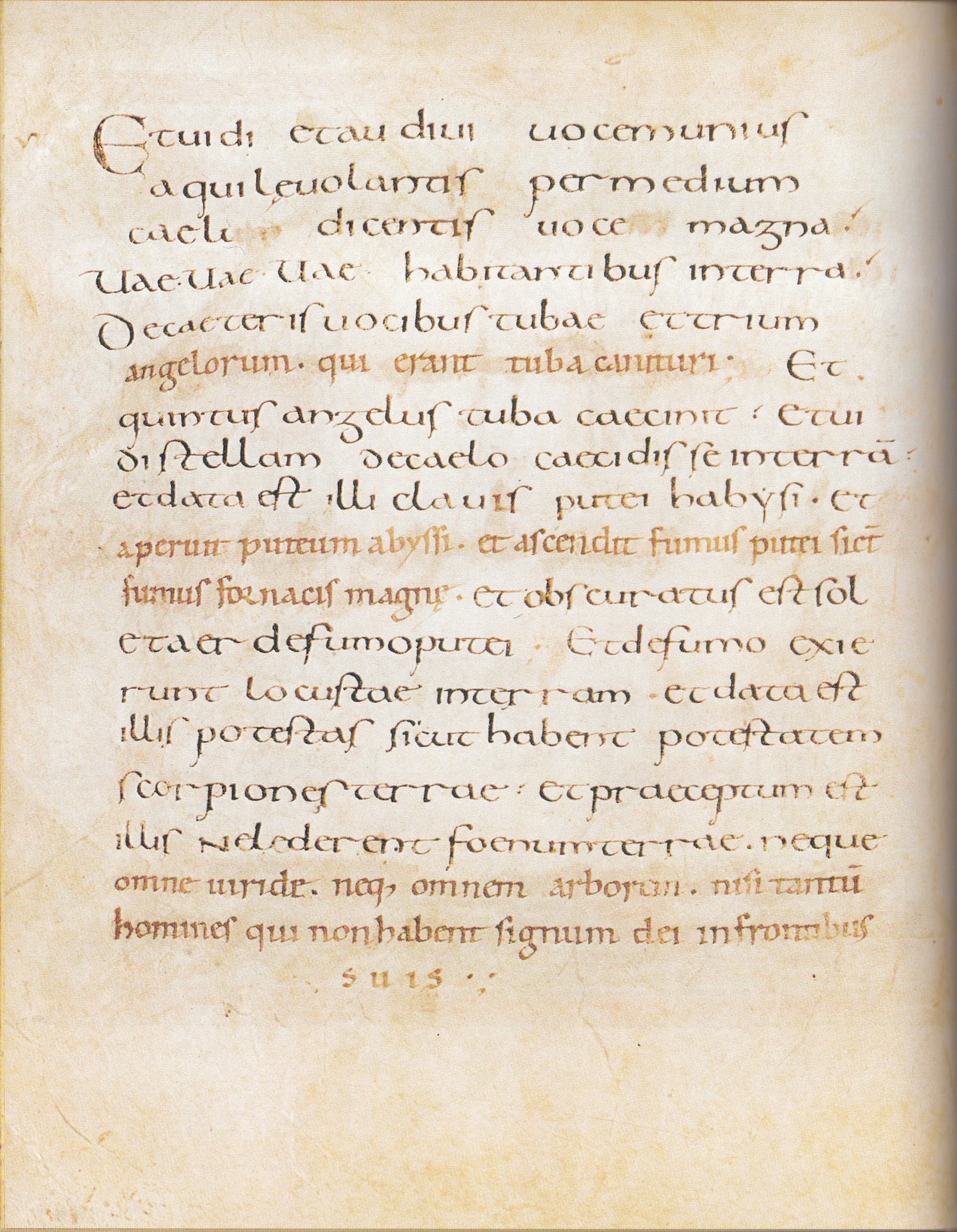
Caroline minuscule text

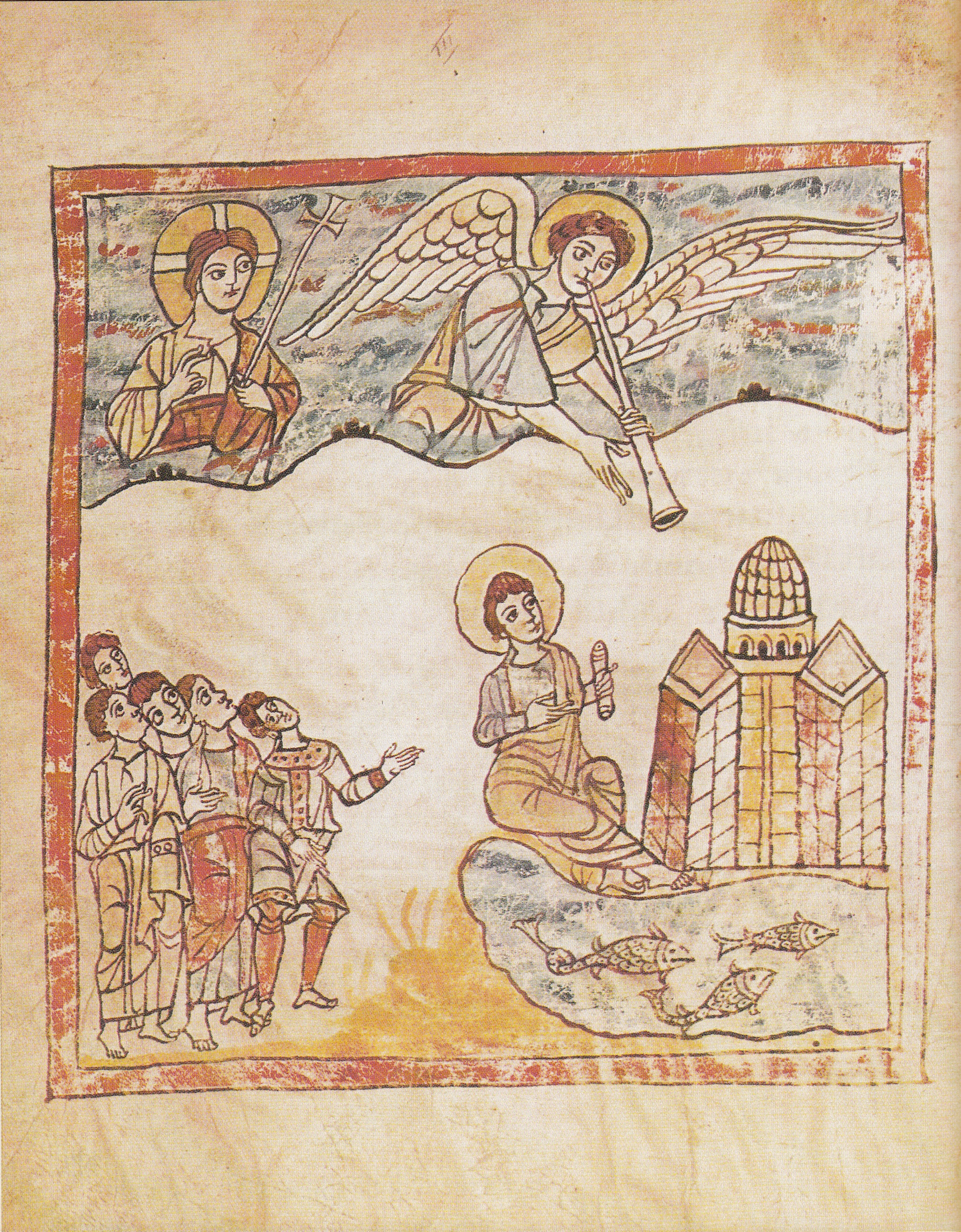
John on the island of Patmos hears "a loud voice, as of a trumpet"

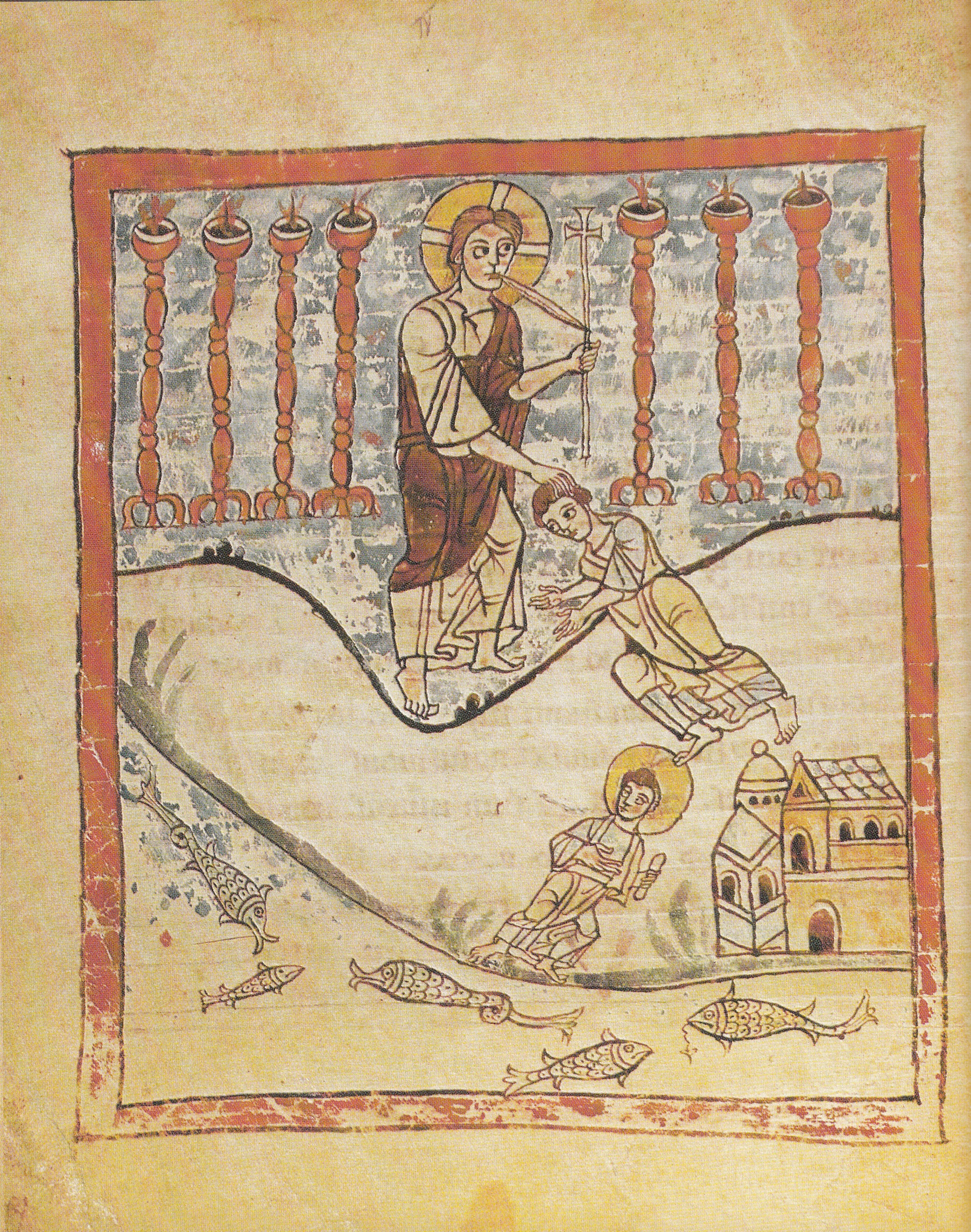
Seven golden lampstands of Revelation 1:12

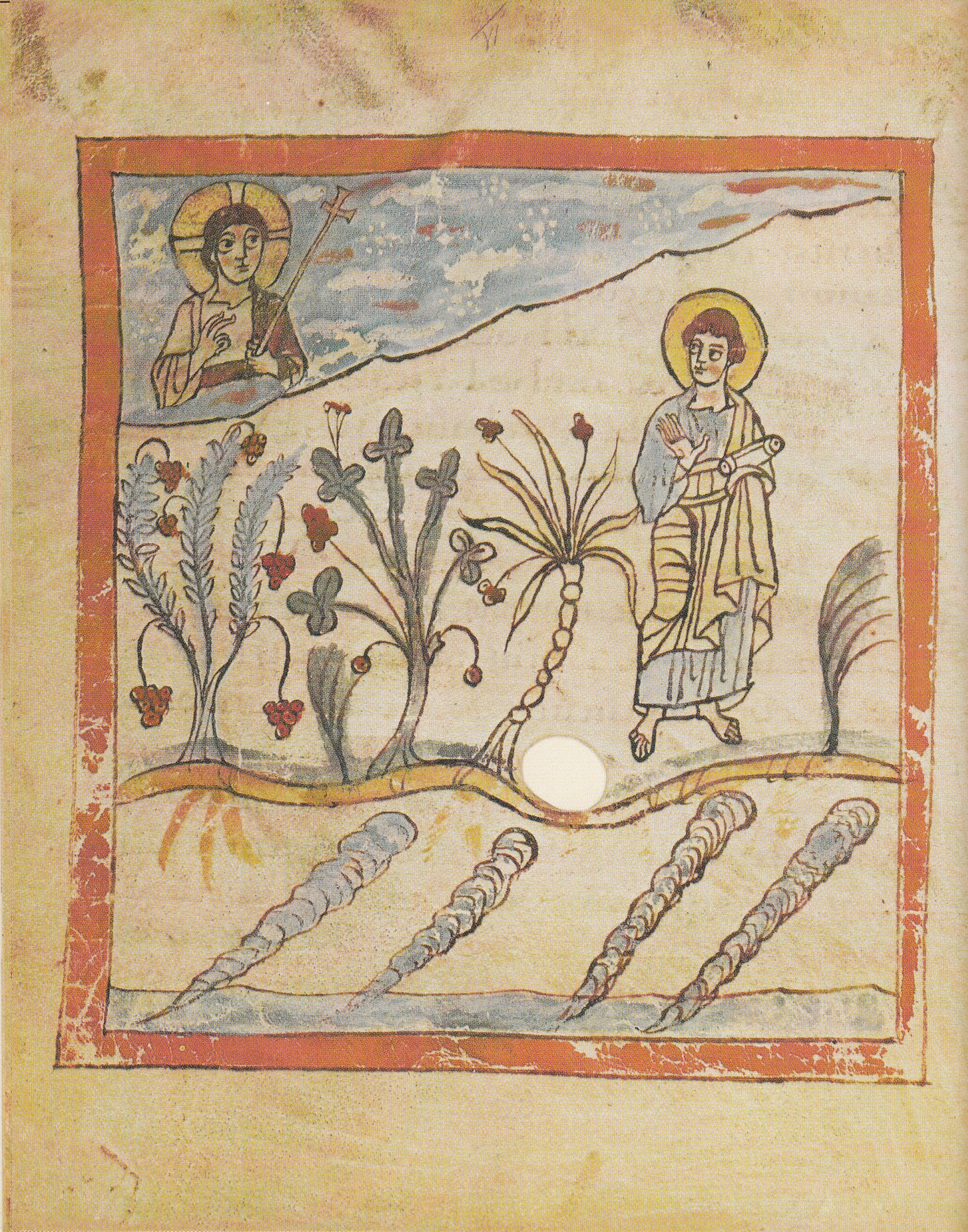
Letter to the church at Ephesus

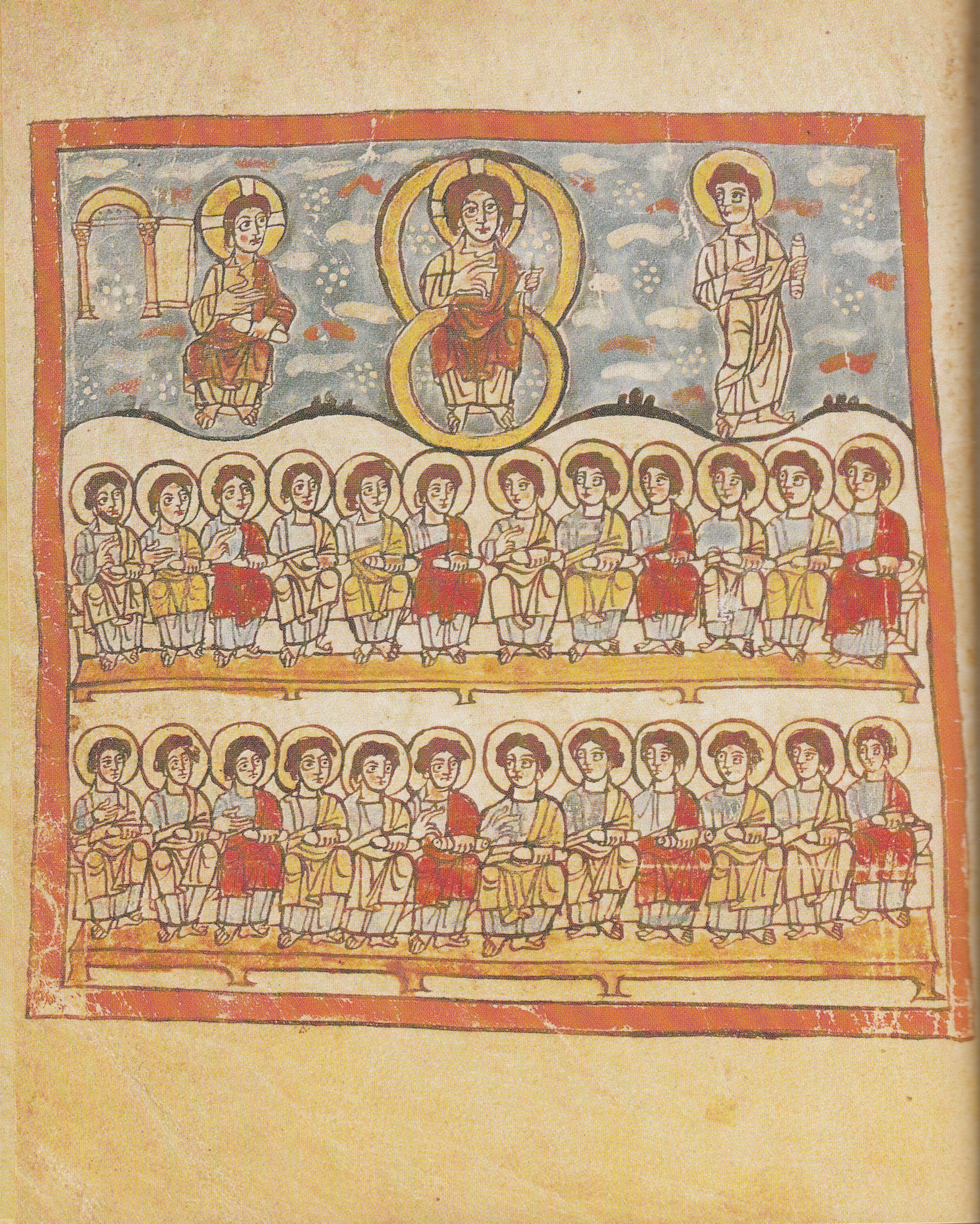
Letter to the church at Philadelphia

== Sources ==
- O'Hear, Natasha; O'Hear, Anthony (2015). Picturing the Apocalypse: The Book of Revelation in the Arts over Two Millennia. Oxford University Press. ISBN 978-0-19-968901-9.
- Snyder, James (1964). "The Reconstruction of an Early Christian Cycle of Illustrations for the Book of Revelation: The Trier Apocalypse". Vigiliae Christianae. 18 (3): 146–162. doi:10.2307/1582090. JSTOR 1582090.
