= Saint-Martin-des-Champs Gospels =

Gospel book

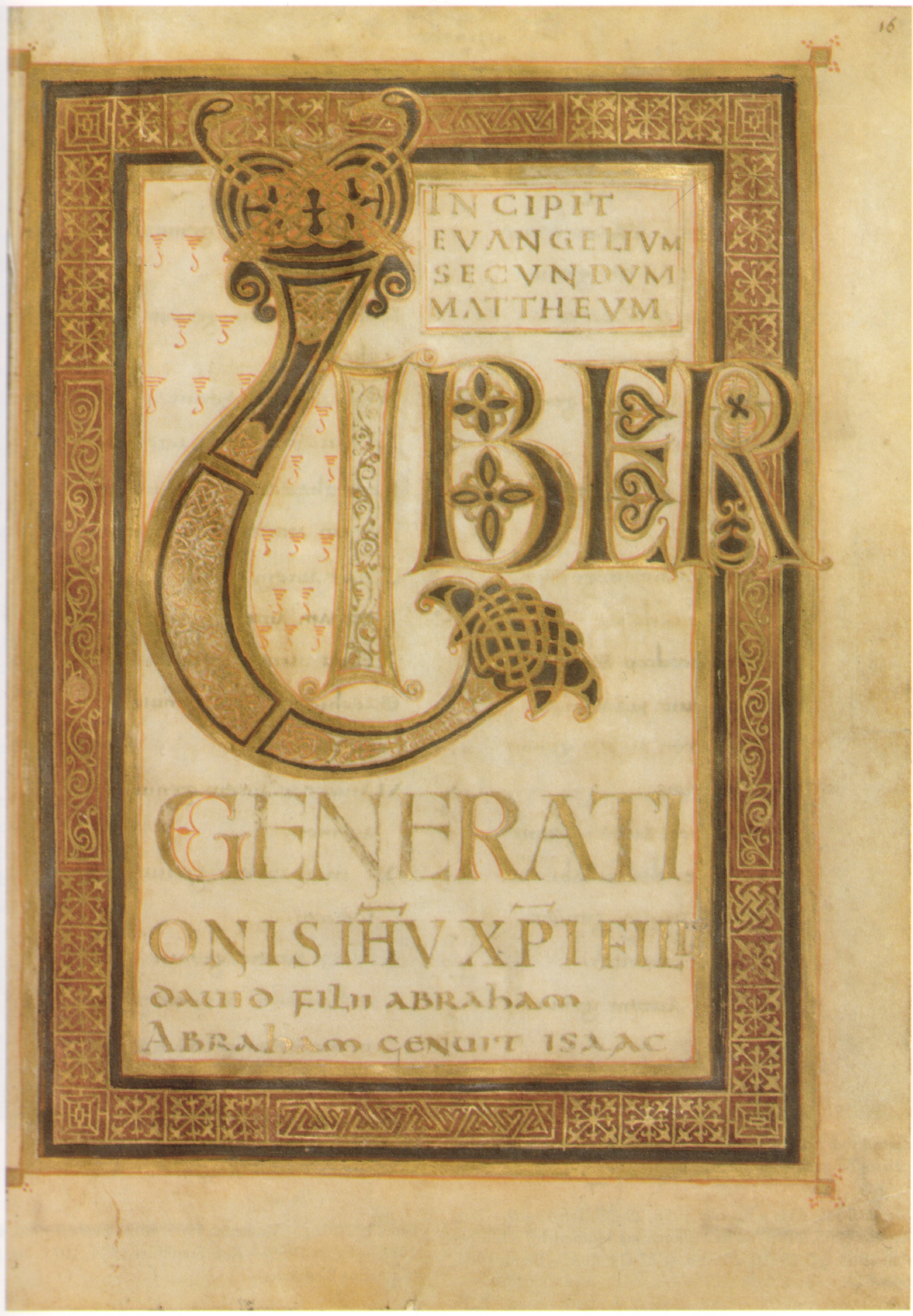
Incipit of Gospel of Matthew

The Saint-Martin-des-Champs Gospels is an illuminated manuscript Gospel book that contains the four canonical Gospels of the New Testament. It was produced in Aachen between the years 783 and 795. It is now in the Bibliothèque de l'Arsenal in Paris. (Library of the Arsenal)

== Description ==
The book has 179 folios of vellum that are 26.5 by 19.5 centimetres (10.4 in × 7.7 in). It contains incipits for Matthew, Mark, and John. Along with the Gospels it has Eusebian Canons drawn in purple and gold. While it still has the Gospel of Luke the incipit for it has since been lost. It is written in the Latin language in Carolingian minuscule script with gold letters. It is an example of Carolingian illumination

== History ==
The book was produced in Aachen between 783 and 795 and is part of the Ada School. The manuscript was kept at the library of Antoine-René de Voyer de Paulmy d'Argenson, which went on to be the Library of the Arsenal after the French Revolution where it is housed today.

== Gallery ==
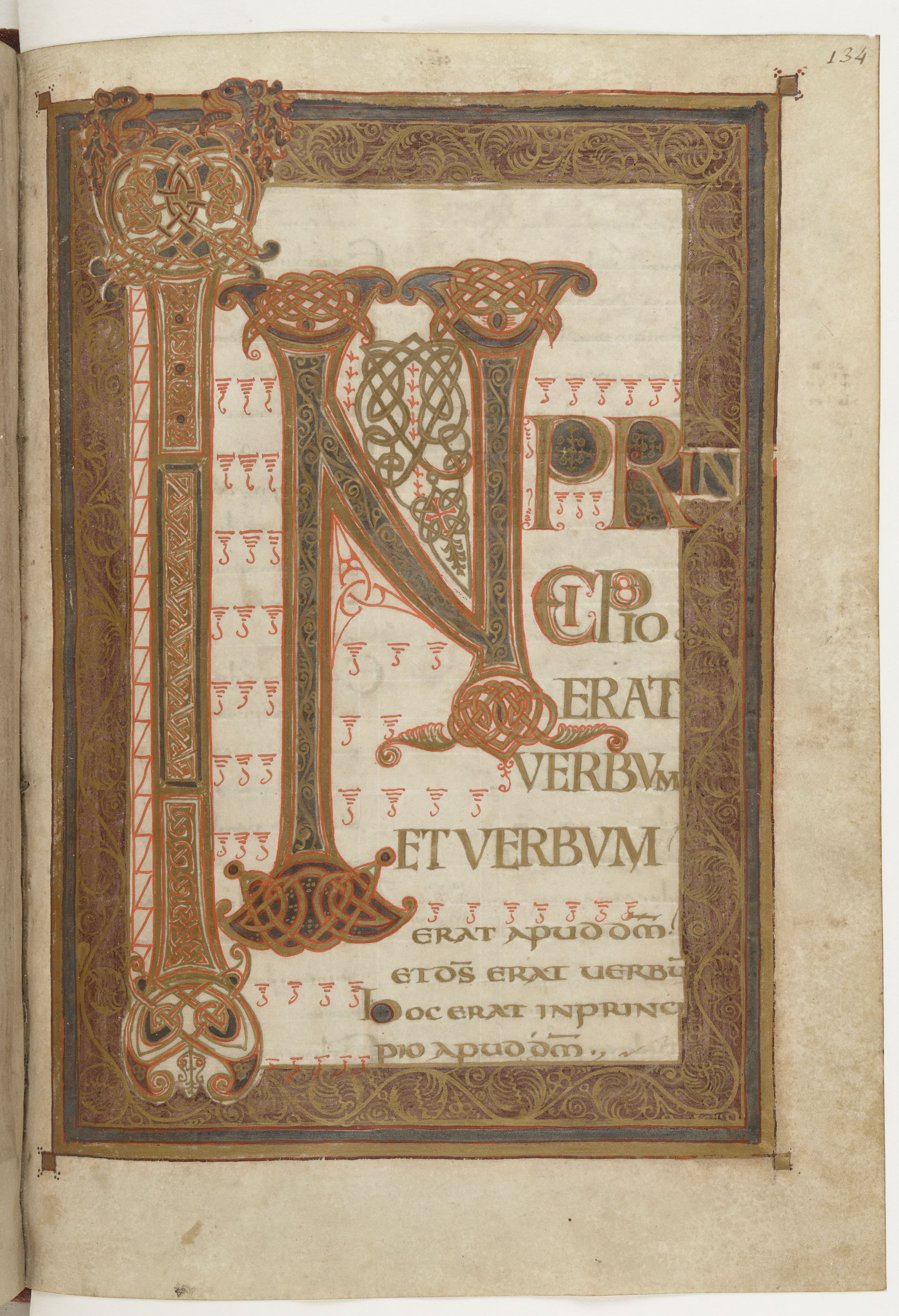
Incipit of John

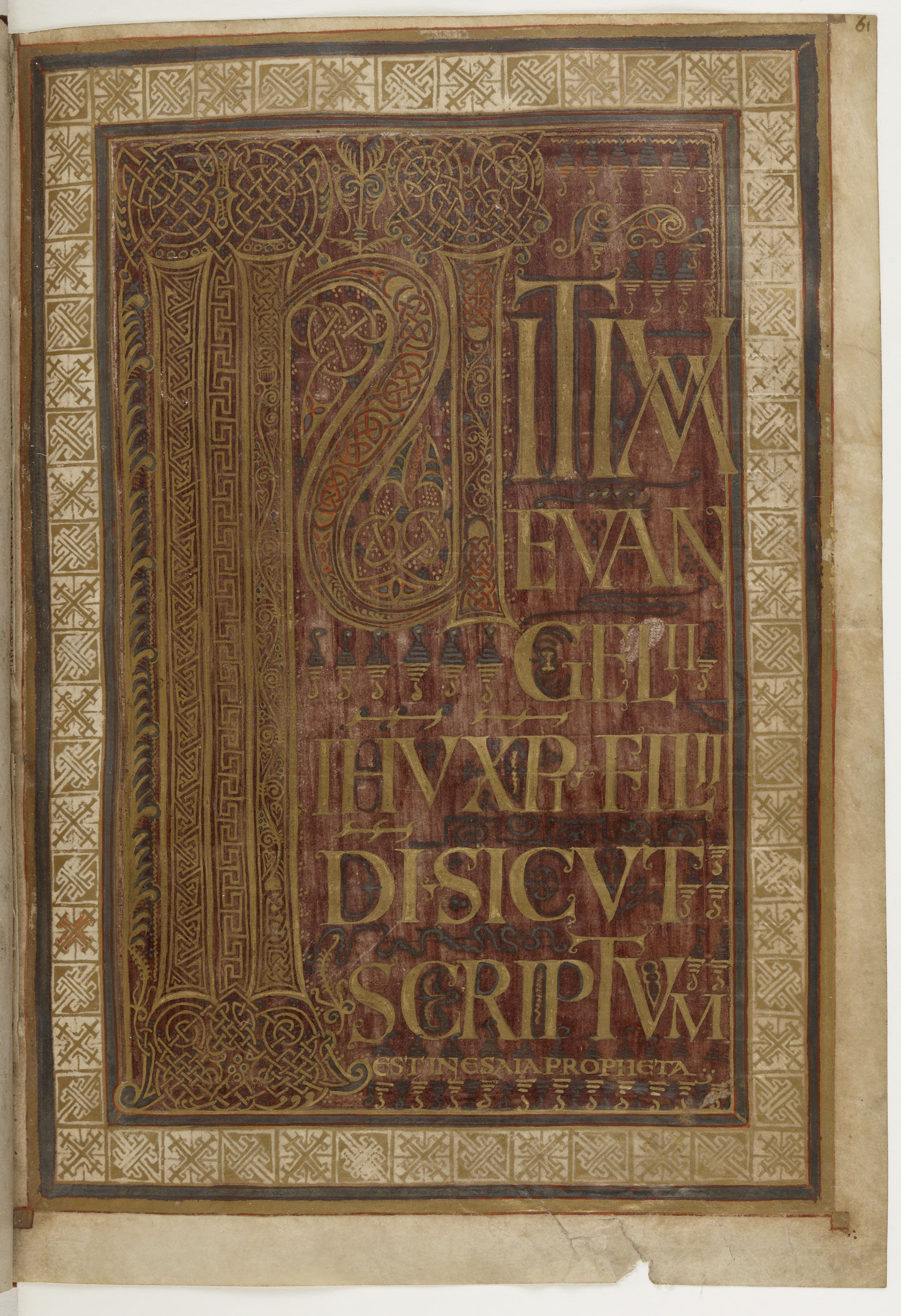
Incipit of Mark
