= Universitätsbibliothek Würzburg =

Würzburg University Library

University Library Würzburg
- Universitätsbibliothek Würzburg

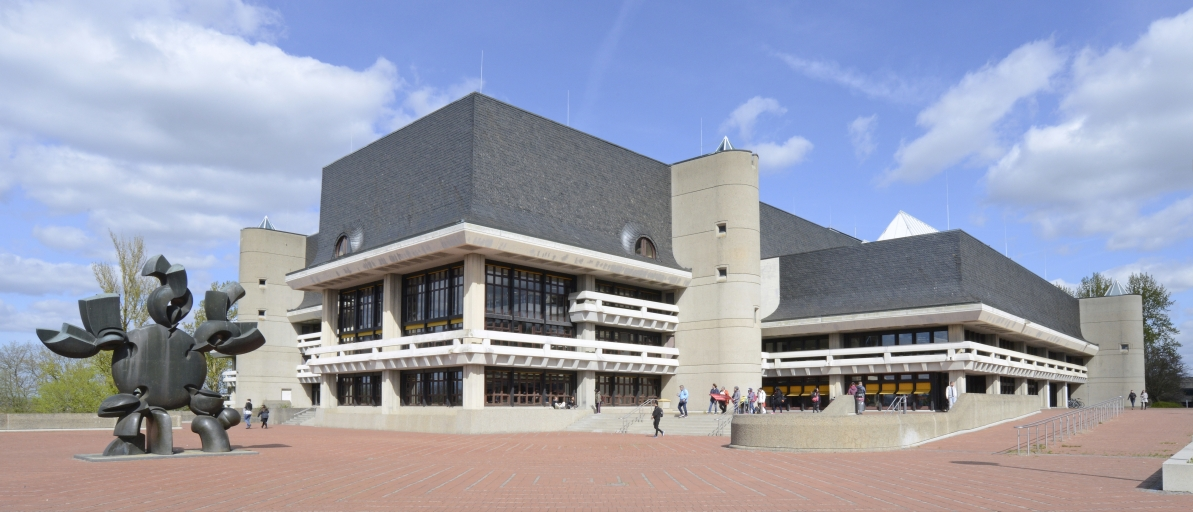
- University Library Würzburg
- 49°46′57″N 9°58′07″E
- Location: Am Hubland, 97074 Würzburg, Germany

Collection
- Size: 3.6 million media (2019)

Other information
- Website: www.bibliothek.uni-wuerzburg.de

The Universitätsbibliothek Würzburg is the central library of the Julius-Maximilians-Universität Würzburg. As a regional library of Lower Franconia, it collects Lower Franconian literature. The Universitätsbibliothek Würzburg is maintained by the Free State of Bavaria. With 3.6 million media, it is one of the largest libraries in Bavaria.

== History ==
In 1619, the prince bishop Johann Gottfried von Aschhausen founded the Bibliotheca Academica Godefridiana. Until 1981, it was housed in the Renaissance building of the Old University at Domerschulstraße 16.

In the 17th and 18th centuries, the book holdings grew through the purchase of private book collections, e.g. of the canons of Augsburg and Eichstätt Johann Georg von Werdenstein, the Würzburg Cathedral Vicar Paul Wenger and the Augsburg citizen Johann Baptist Welser. The Thirty Years' War brought great losses. As a result of the secularisation, numerous manuscripts and incunables came into the possession of the library in 1803. The most valuable manuscript which the library has acquired since then (for 1.35 million DM with special funds from the Bavarian Ministry of Science and Art) is a copy of the Bischofs-Chronik by Lorenz Fries. By 1806 the total holdings had grown to 25,500 volumes. The library received private collections, for example from the Würzburg collectors Friedrich Prym. (see Sosylus of Lacedaemon-papyrus), Philipp Franz Horn (1781–1856), head nurse at the Juliusspital, and the physician Johann Lukas Schönlein. Through donations and purchases – for example the Fürstlich Leiningen's Library Amorbach – the total stock grew to 370,000 volumes in the following 100 years. At the last census before the Bombing of Würzburg in World War II, the total number of volumes was 462,000.

The fire destroyed 80% of the stock. The restoration of the library rooms in Domerschulgasse was completed in 1957. In 1981, the new building (architect: Alexander von Branca) was occupied on the extension site Am Hubland. The building also housed the Institut für Hochschulkunde until June 2014.

Among the important librarians of the Würzburg University Library are Peter von Richarz and Anton Ruland. In 2019, the University Library celebrated its 400th anniversary with a varied and extensive anniversary programme. One of the highlights of the anniversary year was the exhibition "Ivory & Eternity", in which over 70 top pieces from the special collections were presented in a unique compilation.

== Library system and holdings ==
The analogue holdings of the UB comprise about 3.6 million media, including about 8000 current periodicals. In addition to the printed holdings, users have access to an extensive electronic offering (e-book's, e-journals, e-newspapers). All electronic resources are listed in the catalogue of the University Library. Members of the University of Würzburg (students, lecturers, staff) can also use most of the resources from home. The holdings are divided roughly equally between the central library and some 70 departmental, institute and hospital libraries. The numerous locations are the result of the varied history of the university and its library. The cultural-historical significance of the University Library is reflected in its special collections of important historical manuscripts and prints.

== UB Würzburg in numbers (2023) ==
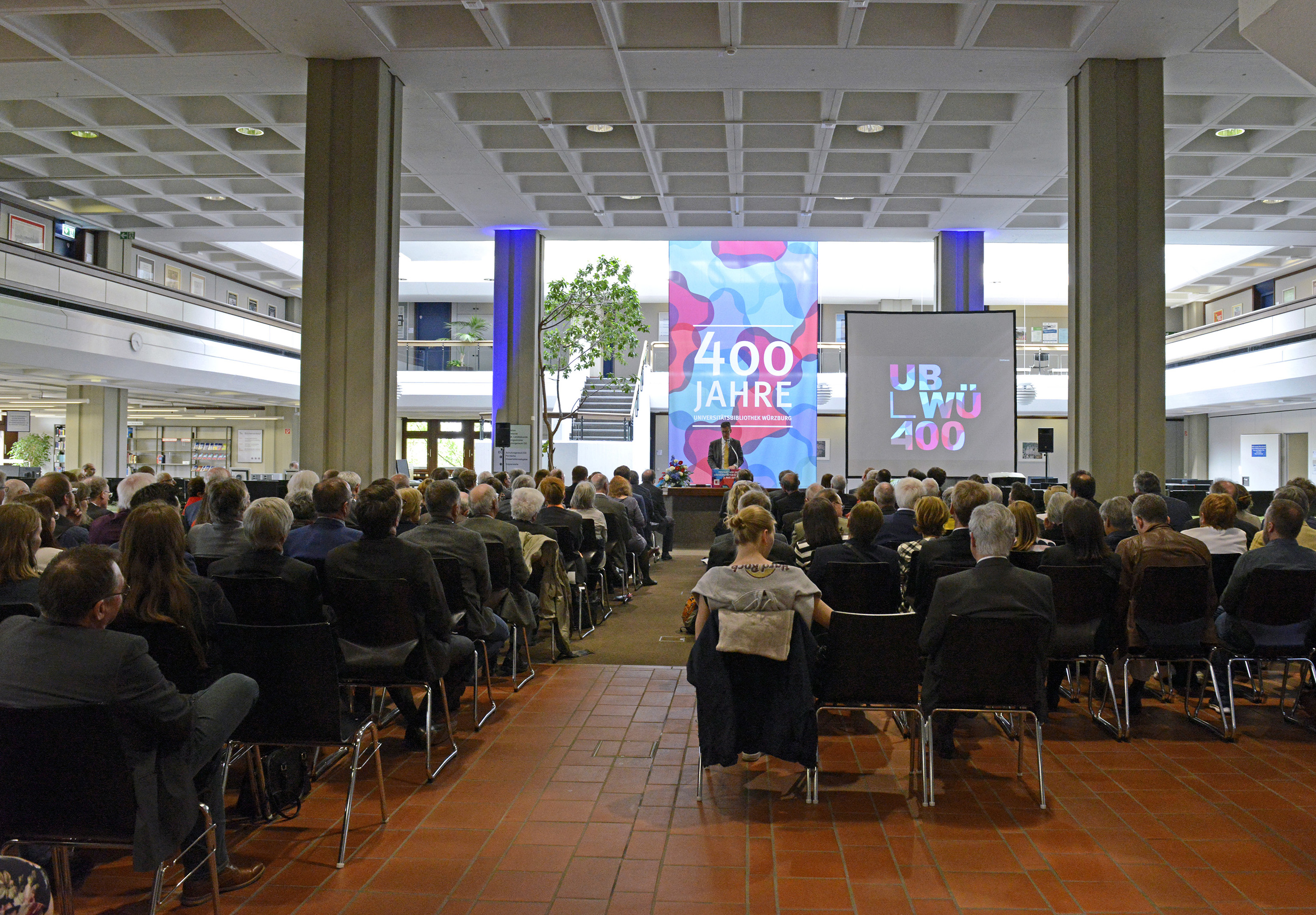
Ceremony for the 400th Anniversary of Würzburg University Library

- Monographs and journals (print): 3,587,078
- Digital items (e-books, e-newspapers and e-journals): 513,499
- New acquisitions (print): 30,128
- Digitized pages: 137,535
- Accesses to E-Books: 5,546,899
- Accesses to articles in e-journals: 1,343,344
- Search queries in the online catalog: 3,437,321
- Access to e-learning offers: 681
- Courses (participants): 4,767
- Registered users: 59,434
- Study desks: 2,636
- Loans: 415,261
- Information requests: 12,387

== Service ==
The University Library offers introductory courses for special target groups, e.g. for students, pupils and teachers, as well as events aimed at a wider audience. These include guided tours of the Special Collections Department under a specific theme. For its intensive and exemplary cooperation with schools, the University Library has repeatedly received the Bavarian seal of approval Libraries – Partners of Schools. In addition, numerous information literacy courses are offered, which are integrated into the curricula of almost all courses of study at the University of Würzburg. Throughout the opening hours of the central library, library users can obtain advice by telephone or in person at the information desk. An information management system is available for enquiries, requests, acquisition suggestions and criticism (Ask the UB, based on OTRS). Reprographic services are offered by the digitisation centre of the University Library. Among the core tasks of the digitisation centre are reprographic services for university and scientific purposes, scanning work for electronic semester sets of the E-Learning platform WueCampus as well as book digitisation within the framework of the Virtual Library Würzburg and Franconica Online. The Würzburg University Library supports the Open Access initiative with the online publication service OPUS Würzburg: On this server, scientists and students of the University of Würzburg can publish their scientific work. First and second publications as well as journals, series and congress reports of Würzburg scientists are available for scientific research worldwide. In addition, scientists at the Julius Maximilian University of Würzburg can publish their research findings in Würzburg University Press (WUP). In accordance with the Open Access idea, the research results published by the publishing house of the University of Würzburg are freely available on the Internet worldwide, free of charge.

== Special collections ==
The special collections of the UB are managed by two departments, each of which has a special area of responsibility:

The Department of Manuscripts and Early Printed Books catalogues and administers the valuable old and special holdings of the University Library. The collection, which has been growing for more than 400 years, experienced its greatest growth during the years of secularisation, when numerous books and manuscripts from the monasteries and foundations in and around Würzburg reached the University Library. Today, the holdings looked after by the department include not only the approx. 2300 manuscripts and approx. 3000 incunabula but also numerous prints from the years before 1801, as well as papyri, autographs, estates, original graphics, historical maps and plans. One of the greatest treasures of the collections is the Kiliansevangeliar and the Fuldaer Evangeliar with the Würzburg market description as well as the round book of the prince bishop Julius Echter.

The Franconian Department Regional Studies is in charge of the most extensive collection of Franconian literature or literature about Franconia, its culture and history in a scientific library. Since 1962, the Lower Franconian Bibliography has also been compiled here as a regional bibliography for the Bavarian administrative district Lower Franconia, today as part of the Bayerische Bibliographie. Spatially seen the main focus of the collection is Lower Franconia, but literature about Middle and Upper Franconia as well as Henneberger Land, Hohenlohe, Württembergisch and Badisches Franken is also collected.
