= Handbook of 809 =

9th century European astronomy text

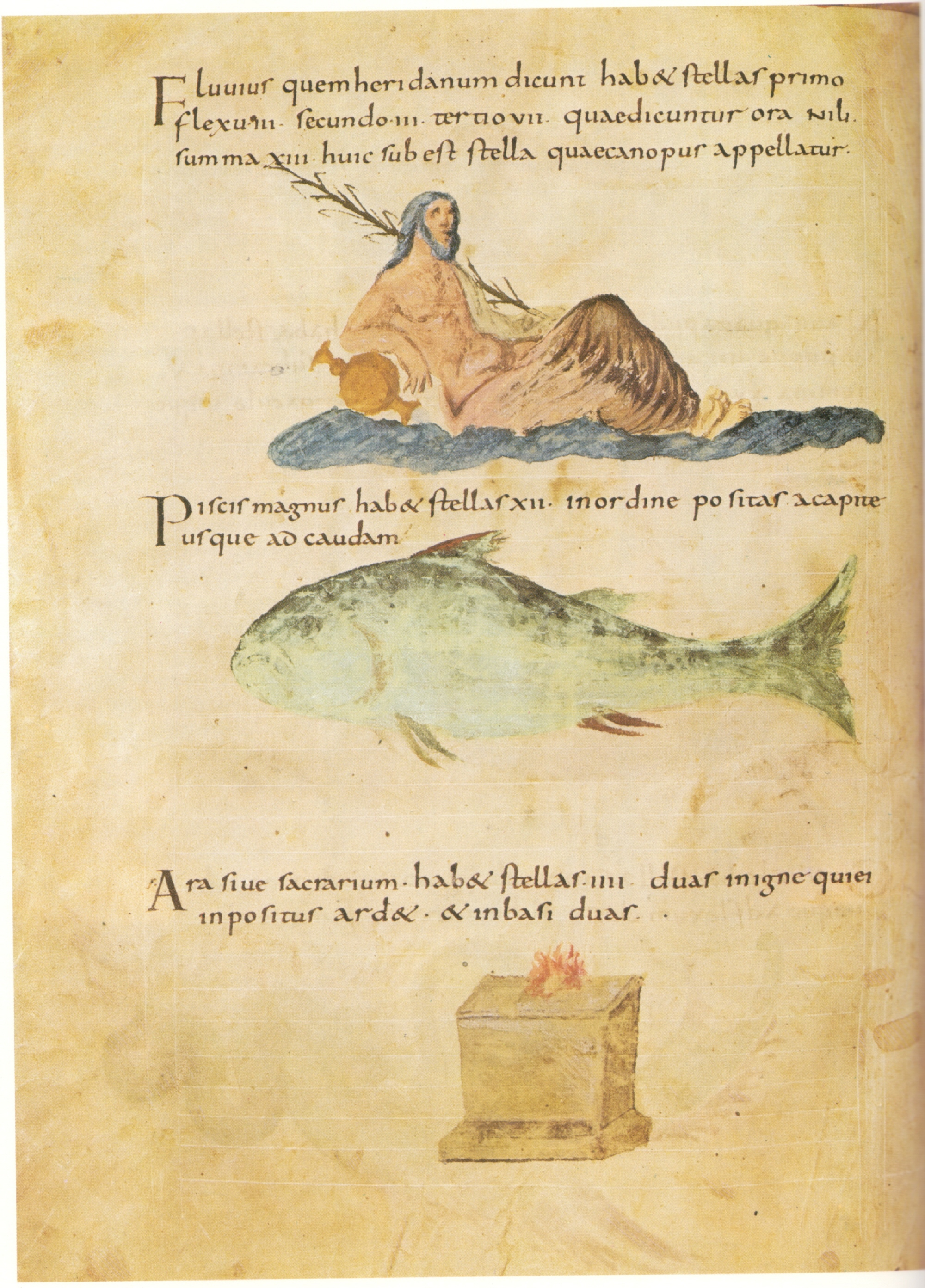
Illustration of the constellations Eridanus, Pisces and Ara (Ms. 3307 fol. 61v).

The so-called Aachen Compilation of 809–812, also called (by Ramírez-Weaver in his 2008 dissertation) the Handbook of 809 is a Carolingian astronomical compendium, compiled by a group of astronomers who gathered at the court of Charlemagne at Aachen in the year 809.

== History ==
Charged with assessing the state of current knowledge about the heavens, they drew from classical sources such as the Historia naturalis by Pliny and the Greek tradition based on the Phaenomena by Aratus of Soli. But the aim of the Carolingian review of astronomy was to Christianize this "pagan" scientific tradition, using a strategy which attempted to keep as much material as possible of the ancient authors while taking care to alter some details which had given cause for concern in early medieval Christian doctrine.

An influential contributor was Adalard of Corbie, Charlemagne's cousin. He brought with him the texts Excerptum de astrologia and De ordine ac positione stellarum in signis, which were incorporated into the Handbook. De ordine ac positione stellarum in signis is a catalogue of 42 constellations (out of the total of 48 listed by Ptolemy). Excerptum de astrologia is an abstract of the Aratus latinus, itself a translation of Aratus' Phaenomena. The Aratus latinus was a product of the 8th century, possibly further revised at Adalard's monastery of Corbie in the late 8th century (Revised Aratus).

== Manuscripts ==
The earliest surviving manuscripts date to only a few years after the Aachen synod of 809–812. The oldest is kept in Paris, as Nouv. acq. lat. 1614, made in Tours in c. 825. Another early copy of the handbook survives in the Biblioteca Nacional de España in Madrid, as Ms. 3307. This copy was made in Metz and dates to c. 840. Other Carolingian manuscripts survive in Vienna (Cod. Vindob. 387), Munich (Clm 210), Berlin (Ms Phill. 1832) and the Vatican (Vat. lat. 645, Reg. lat. 309).

== See also ==
- Carolingian Renaissance
- Leiden Aratea

== Bibliography ==
- Fried, Johannes (2016) [2013]. Charlemagne. Translated by Peter Lewis. Harvard University Press.
- Ramírez-Weaver, Eric M. (2008). Carolingian Innovation and Observation in the Paintings and Star Catalogs of Madrid, Biblioteca Nacional, Ms. 3307 (PhD diss.). New York University.
- Ramírez-Weaver, Eric M. (2017). A Saving Science: Capturing the Heavens in Carolingian Manuscripts. Penn State University Press.
