= Fulda Gospels =

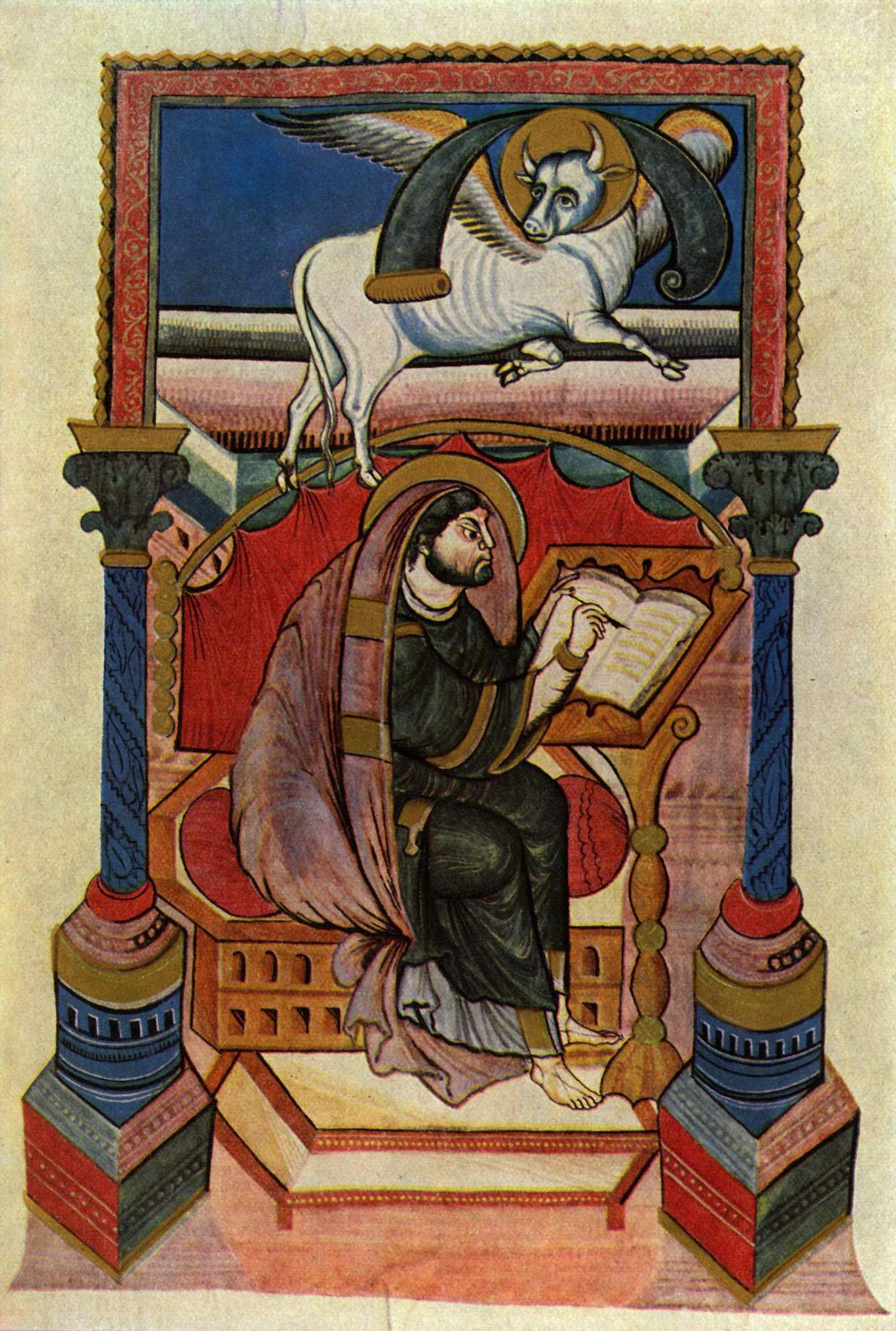
Luke The Evangelist

The Fuldaer Evangeliar is a Carolingian illuminated manuscript, which was created in the middle of the 9th century in the Princely Abbey of Fulda. The painting school of Fulda was one of the few in the succession of the Aachen court school of Charlemagne, in whose tradition also this gospel stands stylistically.

Today the Gospel is located in the Universitätsbibliothek Würzburg (signature: M.p.th.f. 66). The front cover of the codex is decorated with one of the oldest ivory reliefs of the "Younger Metz School".
