= Cleves Evangeliary =

Golden text of the Cleves Evangeliary

The Cleves Evangeliary (Berlin Staatsbibliothek MS Theol. Lat. 260) is an illuminated manuscript from the mid-9th century, likely completed in a workshop at the court of the Emperor Lothar I in Aachen. It consists of 241 parchment leaves with Caroline minuscule text in gold ink.

Berlin Staatsbibliothek MS Theol. Lat. 260 is usually identified as the gospel book given by Lothar to Prüm Abbey in 852 (referred to in a contemporary document) and as the one included in the abbey's library catalogue from 1003. It is not certain, however, that the manuscript Lothar gifted is not Theol. Lat. 733, the Prüm Gospels.

The manuscript was acquired by the Bibliothèque nationale de France in 1802 (following the dissolution of the abbey following the French annexation in 1794), but returned to Germany in 1819. In the course of the negotiations for the manuscript's return, it became mixed up with an unrelated evangeliary of Cleves, and there is a note in the hand of Jacob Grimm attached to folio 1r calling it the Evangeliar aus Kleve. The current name of this manuscript is based on this misidentification, but it has been kept because the alternative name "Lothair Evangeliary" would lead to confusion with the Gospels of Lothair (BNF Lat. 266).
