= Psalter of Charles the Bald =

- Bibliothèque nationale de France
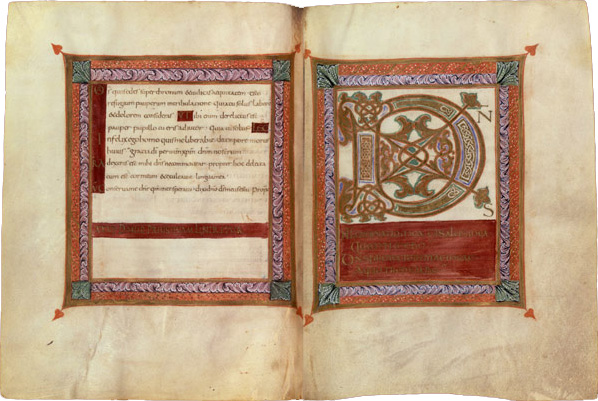
- The Psalter of Charles the Bald, folios 26v–27
- Type: Psalter
- Date: Mid 9th century
- Place of origin: Scriptorium of the Carolingian palace
- Language(s): Latin
- Scribe(s): Liuthard
- Patron: Charles the Bald
- Material: Parchment
- Size: 24 x 19.5 cm
- Script: Uncial
- Previously kept: Metz Cathedral
- Accession: 1732

The Psalter of Charles the Bald (Latin: Psalterium Caroli Calvi; French: Psautier de Charles le Chauve) is a psalter copied by the illuminator Liuthard at the palace school of the Frankish emperor Charles the Bald, before 869. It notably presents a rare example of original binding in goldwork and ivory. It is kept at the Bibliothèque nationale de France (MS Latin 1152).

== History ==
On folio 3 the recipient of the manuscript is represented on the throne: it is Charles the Bald, grandson of Charlemagne. His name is mentioned again at the end of Psalm 100 and then at the end of the litanies. He is in fact invoked there in the company of his first wife Ermentrude of Orléans (f.172). The manuscript is therefore dated between the year of their marriage, 842, and the year of Ermentrude's death in 869, and undoubtedly closer to the latter date.

The copyist signed at the end of the manuscript on folio 172v: Hic calamus facto Liuthardi fine quievit ("Here, its job done, Liuthard's pen rested"). Liuthard is in fact responsible for the copying of several manuscripts produced at the same time for the same sovereign: the Codex Aureus of St. Emmeram in 870, or the gospels today preserved in Darmstadt (Landesbibliothek, MS 746). Liuthard could be responsible for the gold letter copy, the decorations of the text as well as the miniatures, according to Rosamond McKitterick. The royal scriptorium in question, whose precise location is not known, need not have accommodated a large number of artists because the decorations of the manuscripts show great homogeneity.

The manuscript was probably given by Charles the Bald to the Cathedral of Saint-Étienne in Metz after his coronation there as king of Lotharingia in 869. It was kept in the cathedral treasury until the 17th century. According to a note by the librarian Étienne Baluze, it was given by the Metz canons to Jean-Baptiste Colbert in 1674. The latter's entire collection was acquired in 1732 by the Bibliothèque du Roi, predecessor of the current Bibliothèque nationale de France.

== Description ==
=== Text ===
The book is intended for private devotion, containing the Psalter in its Gallican form established by Saint Jerome. It contains the psalms (f.4v-155) then the canticles (f.155v-166) and the litanies and various prayers (f.167-172).

=== Decoration ===
The entire book is written in gold letters: in uncial script for the psalms, in Carolingian_minuscule for the rest of the text. Each incipit is written on purple-coloured bands as well as the titles in capitals, and decorated initials (including 8 large ones) mark the beginning of each chapter.

The manuscript also contains three miniatures, each accompanied by a caption in gold on a purple background:

- David and his musicians (f.1v): they play psaltery, cymbals, kithara and strings, with the caption: Quattuor hic socii comitantur in ordine David ("Here four companions accompany David in order")
- Portrait of Charles the Bald, seated on a throne, holding the globe and the sceptre and surmounted by the hand of God, with the caption: Cum sedeat Karolus magno coronatus honore / Est Josiae similis parque Theodosio ("When Charles sits crowned with great honour / He is like Josiah and the equal of Theodosius")
- Portrait of Saint Jerome (f.4r), translator of the psalms, with the caption: Nobilis interpres Hieronimus atque sacerdos / nobiliter pollens transscripsit iura Davidis ("Jerome, noble interpreter and nobly illustrious priest, translated the laws of David").

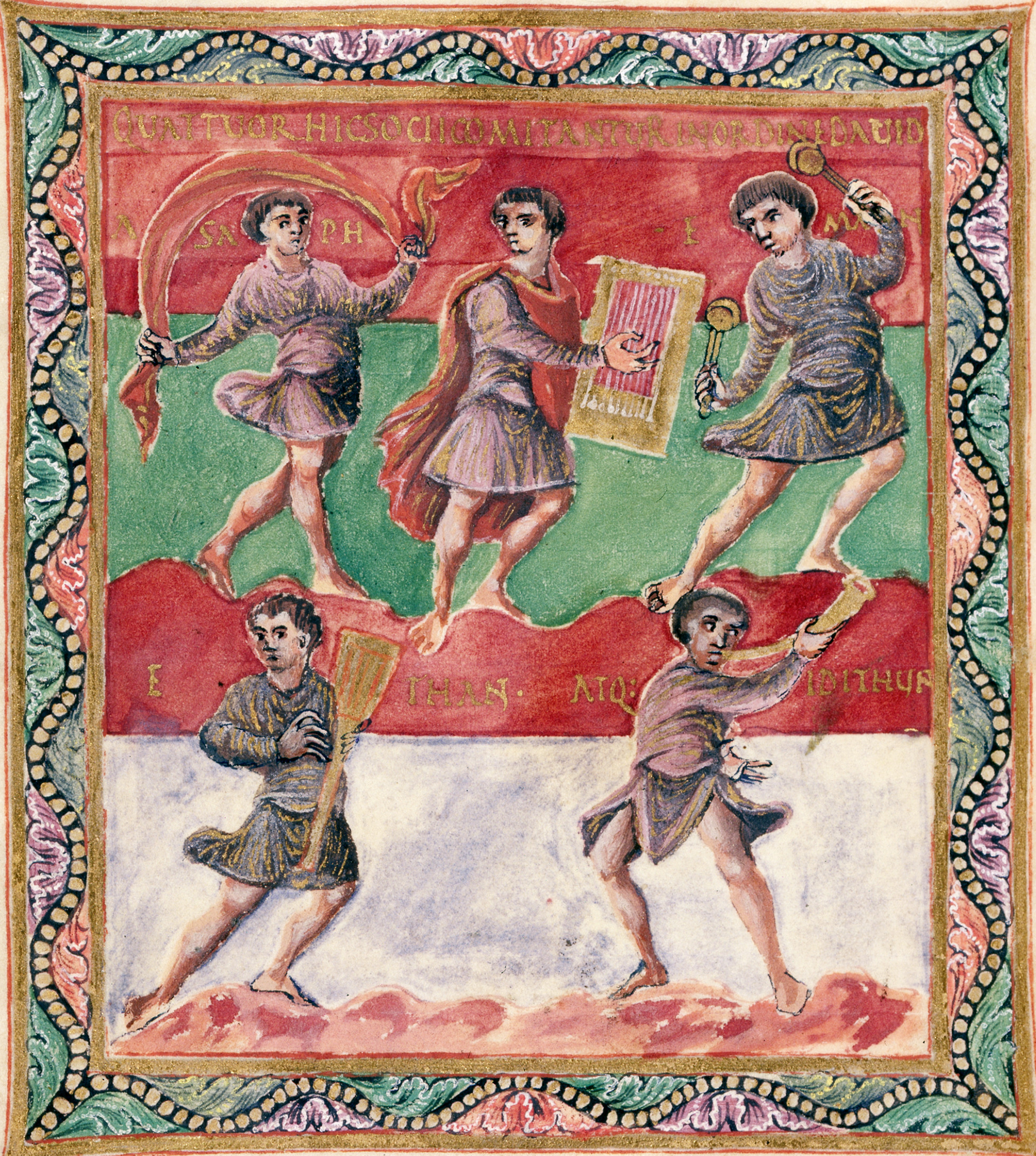

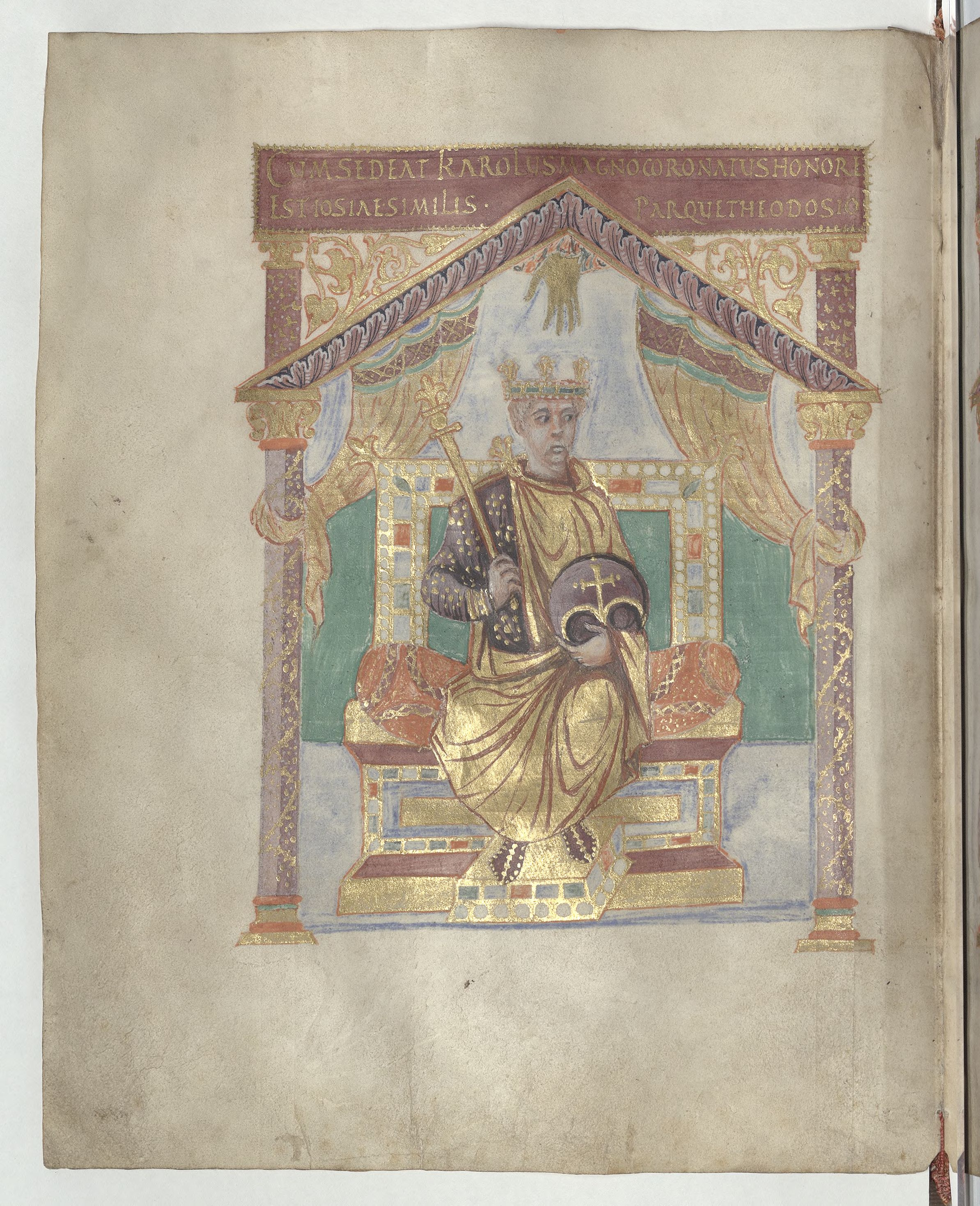

=== Binding ===
The work is one of the rare Carolingian manuscripts to have preserved its original binding intact. It consists of two gilded silver plates on oak boards, decorated with stones, pearls and glass paste, framing two ivory plaques. These two plaques are representative of the “Liuthard style”, named after the copyist of the manuscript, and their motifs are inspired by illustrations of the Utrecht Psalter, which dates back to the years 845–855.

The upper plate illustrates the text of Psalm 57 (56): 4–6: “My soul is among lions; and I lie even among them that are set on fire, even the sons of men, whose teeth are spears and arrows, and their tongue a sharp sword...They have prepared a net for my steps; my soul is bowed down: they have digged a pit before me, into the midst whereof they are fallen themselves." The soul of David is shown sitting on the lap of an angel.

The lower plate represents the scene of Nathan reproaching David and Bathsheba for the death of Uriah, with the parable of the rich man and the poor man and his sheep used by the prophet in his prophecy.

The binding underwent a complete restoration in 2019 and a new digitization.
