= Montpellier Psalter =

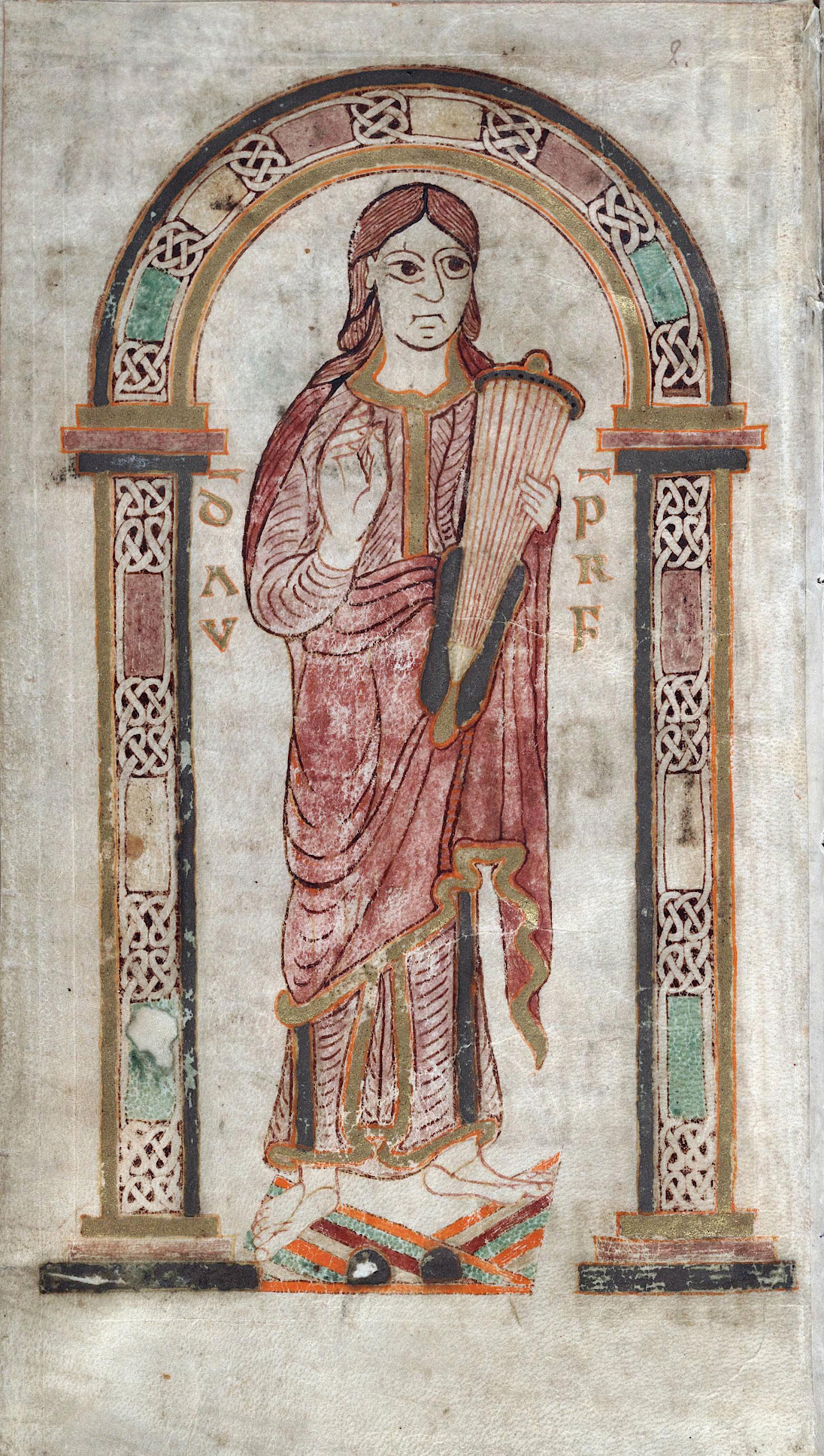
Miniature illustration of King David playing the rotta in the Montpellier Psalter

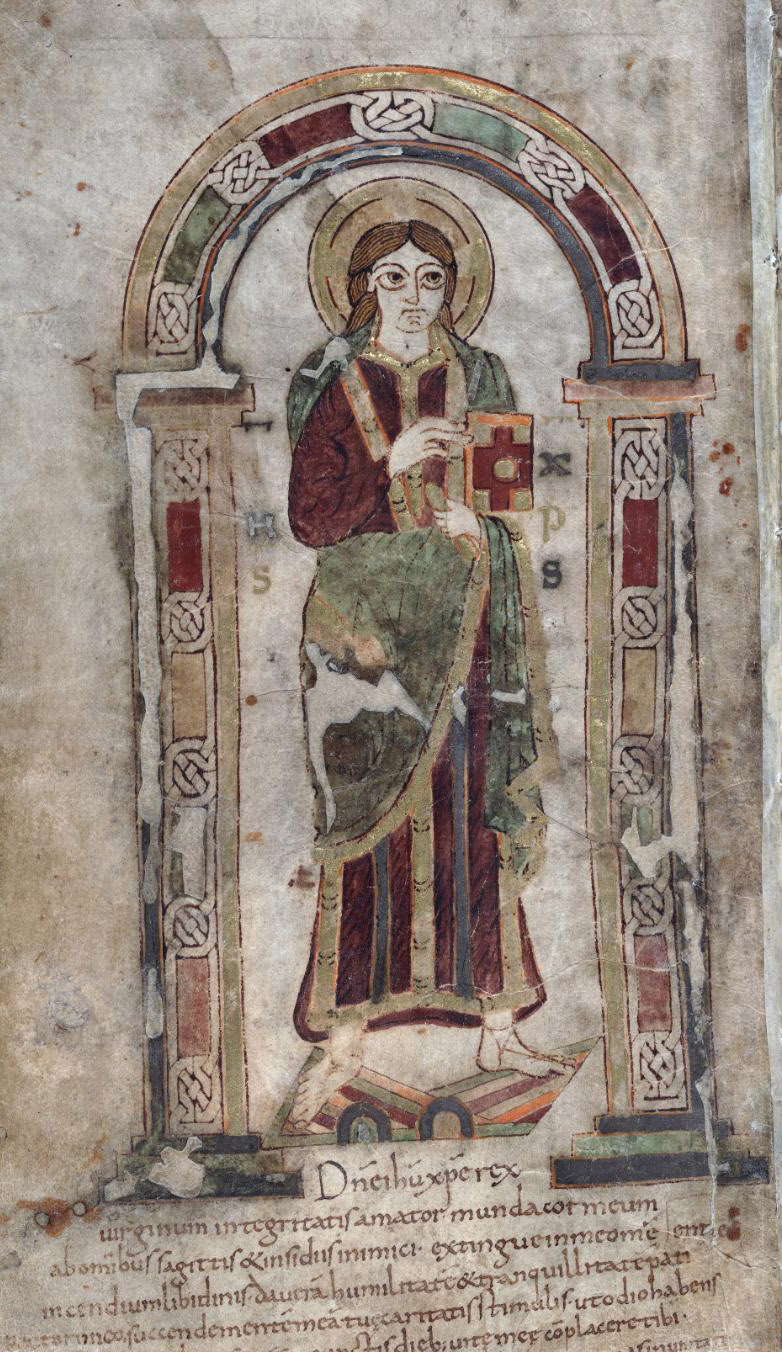
Miniature illustration of Jesus Christ

The Montpellier Psalter (Montpellier, Bibliothèque Interuniversitaire, Faculté de Médecine, H.409, also known as Tassilopsalter, formerly also Psalter of Charlemagne) is one of the oldest Psalters from the Carolingian era and was made in the 8th century in the then-Bavarian Mondsee Abbey during the reign of the Agilolfings and was supposedly originally dedicated to the ducal family of Tassilo III of Bavaria. The book saw a turbulent history and is now held at the Bibliothèque Interuniversitaire in the medicine faculty building at Montpellier, under the shelfmark H. 409.

This small sized psalter contains two miniature illustrations that picture Jesus Christ and King David, 165 larger initials in gold and silver and more than 2000 smaller initials in the colours yellow, red and green. This generously illuminated manuscript is influenced by an imagery from Roman Late Antiquity and is most like based on sixth-century models from Ravenna. The beginning of each psalm is indicated by an ornamented Initial in uncial script. The language of the text is Latin.

== History ==
The Montpellier Psalter was long considered to be the oldest Carolingian Psalter of the Frankish Empire, due to its late antique illustrations. Early scientific sources stated Auxerre as the point of origin and dated it between 772 and 795 CE. The philologist Bernhard Bischoff (1906–1991) was the first to revise this, proving that the real origin of the psalter was the Bavarian region and showed that it was made in the scriptorium of Mondsee Abbey near Salzburg in what is now Upper Austria. This prove was among other factors done by demonstrating the similarities of the ornaments to the Tassilo Chalice of Kremsmünster Abbey.

In that period the Bavarian duchy under the rule of the Agilolfings saw its last period of relative independence from Frankish rule and held close political and cultural ties to the Lombards in Italy. Liutberga, the wife of Duke Tassilo III was even a daughter of the Lombard King Desiderius. These connections are today considered the most likely explanation for the late-antique, upper-Italian influence in the imagery and ornaments of the Psalter.

After power struggles and the loss of their Lombardian allies the Agilolfings were finally removed from power in 788 by Charlemagne and the Bavarian duchy was integrated into the Frankish Empire. It is believed that during this time the Psalter was taken from Mondsee and brought to the western part of Francia as a spoil of war. Even Cotani and Hrodrud, the two daughter of Tassilo III, who himself was taken in custody and finally banned into monastic life, were brought into west Franconian captivity. It is believed that they might have taken the psalter with them from Mondsee to Chelle in today's France. In the 9th century the book was already in Auxerre, where the final five pages, that presumptively carried the dedications to the Bavarian ducal family, were removed from the psalter and a new dedication under the title Laudes regiae was added to the then Frankish queen Fastrada, the fourth wife of Charlemagne. Since she died in the year 794, this addition must have taken place before this date.

In the year 1721, the psalter is proven to have been in Lyon, as part of the collection of President Bouhier, along with H. 196, a famous chansonnier also now in the Bibliothèque Interuniversitaire. After his death, Cîteaux Abbey bought the book and during the turmoils of the French Revolution it finally came into the university library of Montpellier, where it is still kept today. This final home also gave its name to the psalter in the modern literature.

During the 1988 exhibition of Bavarian history, that was jointly organised by the Free State of Bavaria and the Austrian Federal State of Salzburg in Rosenheim and Mattsee, the Montpellier Psalter was shown for the first time after centuries in its region of origin.

== Literature ==
- Hermann Dannheimer (Hrsg.), Die Bajuwaren - von Severin bis Tassilo 488 - 788; Katalog zur gemeinsamen Landesausstellung des Freistaates Bayern und des Landes Salzburg, Rosenheim/Bayern, Mattsee/Salzburg, 19. Mai bis 6. November 1988, 1st edition, Munich: Prähistor. Staatssammlung, 1988, 468 pages (in German)
