= James Snyder (art historian) =

American art historian

- Born: James E. Snyder; 1928
- Died: 1990 (aged 61–62)
- Occupation: Art historian

James E. Snyder (1928–1990) was an American art historian, specializing in Northern Renaissance art. His Northern Renaissance Art of 1985 was a standard textbook on the subject for several decades, with a posthumous revised edition in 2005, revised by Larry Silver and Henry Luttikhuizen, being somewhat replaced by Jeffrey Chipps Smith's The Northern Renaissance of 2004. Snyder taught at Bryn Mawr College from 1964 until his retirement in 1989. He died of liver disease in August 1990, aged 62.

He is not to be confused with the American museum director and art historian, James S. Snyder (born 1952).

== Career ==
Born in Peoria, Illinois, Snyder graduated with a B.A. from the University of Colorado in 1952, continuing to Princeton University for an M.F.A.in 1955. There he studied under Kurt Weitzmann and it was Erwin Panofsky who suggested the Early Netherlandish painter Geertgen tot Sint Jans as a thesis subject. Still at Princeton, Snyder completed this under Robert Koch in 1958, having had a Fulbright fellowship for 1955–1957.

He taught at the University of Michigan, Ann Arbor, as an assistant professor from 1957, being promoted associate professor in 1962. In 1964 he moved to Bryn Mawr College, initially as an associate professor, but a full professor of art history in 1969. In 1985 he became Fairbank Professor of Humanities. While at Bryn Mawr he was also a visiting lecturer in art history at Princeton and Johns Hopkins University.

Awards included the A. Kingsley Porter Prize from the College Art Association of America in 1960 for his paper on "The Early Haarlem School of Painting". In 1962–1963 he spent a year as a Berenson fellow at Harvard's Villa I Tatti near Florence, on a second Fulbright. He received fellowships from the National Endowment for the Humanities for 1972–1973 and 1985.

== Books ==
- Geertgen tot Sint Jans and the Haarlem School of Painting, Princeton University, 1958
- Northern Renaissance Art: Painting, Sculpture, the Graphic Arts from 1350 to 1575, Englewood Cliffs, NJ: Prentice-Hall/Abrams, 1985, ISBN 0136235964.
    - 2nd edn. 2005, revised by Larry Silver and Henry Luttikhuizen, ISBN 0-13-150547-5
- Medieval Art: Painting-Sculpture-Architecture, 4th–14th Century, New York: H.N. Abrams, 1989.
- Introduction to The Metropolitan Museum of Art. Vol. 5, The Renaissance in the North, 1987, online
