= Georg Reismüller =

German librarian (1882–1936)

Director-General Bavarian State Library
- In office August 1929 – 20 August 1935
- Preceded by: Hans Schnorr von Carolsfeld
- Succeeded by: Rudolf Buttmann

Personal details
- Born: 11 May 1882 Ingolstadt
- Died: May 12, 1936 (aged 54) Günzburg
- Parents: Lorenz Reismüller, Royal Bavarian State Railways Office Assistant (father); Pauline Reismüller (mother)
- Education: fall of 1901 graduate of the Royal Old High School in Ingolstadt
- Alma mater: 1907 degree in Classical and Oriental Philology from LMU Munich and two semesters newer languages after.: In the fall of 1905 and the summer of 1906 he studied French in Besançon, Lyon; English language in London and French in Brussels.; From 1904 to 1907 he spent his holiday in Italy, Dalmatia, North Africa, Scotland, Norway and Svalbard.: In the fall of 1907 he passed his state examinations in Roman Philology, he attended the lectures of Professors Hermann Breymann, Wilhelm von Christ, Hermann von Grauert, Georg von Hertling, Fritz Hommel, Karl Krumbacher, Ernst Kuhn, Ernest Lindl, Ivan von Müller, Lucian Scherman, Josef Schick (Anglist), Ernst Sieper Richard Simon, Carl Weyman, Eduard Wölfflin, .; he attended several semesters as a full member of the Breymann, Kuhn and Schick seminars.
- Profession: In 1909 he passed the exam as librarian with good grades.; In 1910 he became curator at the Bavarian State Library.

Georg Reismüller was a German librarian. He was the Director-General of the Bavarian State Library from 1929 to 1935.

From April 1, 1923 to 1928 during the Occupation of the Ruhr he was commissioned to set up the Pfälzische Landesbibliothek Speyer as part of the art funding program, headed this Library, (Note: Pfalzhilfe, 1919–1930, The librarian Georg Reismüller (1882–1936) was commissioned to set up a district library in Speyer as part of the art funding program. Historisches Lexikon Bayerns, , Rheinland-Pfälzische Personendatenbank:) became member of the Bavarian People's Party and befriended with Heinrich Held.

== Overview ==
As a Catholic and member of the People's Party, Reismüller's appointment was opposed by officials and functionaries with völkisch and National Socialist inclinations. (Bd. 3: 2, 1957, 378).

He was dismissed by the Reichsminister of Science, Education and Culture Bernhard Rust on July 23, 1935 (with effect from August 20); being replaced by a rival, Leidinger, who had used his rival's term to scrutinize his actions and file dossiers on his »mismanagement« and »megalomania« now had an opportunity to present a comprehensive report in which the »atrocities« of Reismüller's.

== Sinological work ==
As a Romanist and Anglist, Reismüller was self-taught in Chinese. It can be assumed that Reismuller's interest arose either from private inclination or was developed and promoted by his academic teachers, especially Ernst Kuhn and Lucian Scherman.

An assessment of the sinological work is today, in the absence of other material, only possible with the help of the publications of Reismüller, and there are few, albeit substantial: A small contribution on Chinese and European technology. points out that in the Gujin Tushu Jicheng (the great Chinese encyclopedia of 1726), (Note: Gujin Tushu Jicheng,) representations of European machines based on European models, especially Agostino Ramelli Jacques Besson and Fausto Veranzio, to which Hugo Theodor Horwitz. and Carl Graf von Klinckowström. had drawn attention, from the Chinese works of two Jesuit missionaries, namely the T'ai-hsi shui-fa ["European Hydraulics": 1612] by Sabatino de Ursis and the Yüan-hsi ch'i t'u-shuo ["Illustrated depiction of the workable machines of the Far West"; 1627] by Johann Schreck. He explains the transfer process by means of four illustrations, each showing the European original and the Chinese designation, Joseph Needham, the authority in the field of Chinese scientific history, considers Reismüller as a special service, the origin of the Crawler excavators from Besson's factory have proven. On a trip to China in 1830, Neumann succeeded in acquiring Chinese literature of 10,000 copies. Since the Prussian government had given a subsidy, they received a share of the collection, while the Bavarian government bought their share for a professorship. This was the basis for today's East Asian collection of the Bavarian State Library.

== Publications by Georg Reismüller ==
1. Romanische Lehnwörter (Erstbelege) bei Lydgate. Inaugural-Dissertation zur Erlangung der Philosophischen Doktorwürde der Philosophischen Fakultät Sektion I der Kgl. Ludwig-Maximilians-Universität München, vorgelegt von Georg Reismüller aus Regensburg am 23. Juli 1909. Naumburg a. S. 1909 Lippert & Co. (G.Pätz'sche Buchdruckerei). 53 S.
2. Romanische Lehnwörter (Erstbelege) bei Lydgate. Ein Beitrag zur Lexicographie des Englischen im XV. Jahrhundert. Von Dr. Georg Reismüller. Leipzig: A. Deichert 1911. XII, 134 S. (Münchner Beiträge zur romanischen und englischen Philologie. 48).
3. Europäische und chinesische Technik. Von Dr. Georg Reismüller-München. In: Geschichtsblätter für Technik, Industrie und Gewerbe. 1.1914,2-7.
4. Karl Friedrich Neumann, Seine Lern- und Wanderjahre, seine chinesischen Büchersammlung. Von Georg Reismüller (München). In: Aufsätze zur Kultur- und Sprachgeschichte, vornehmlich des Orients, Ernst Kuhn zum 70. Geburtstag am 7. Februar 1916 gewidmet, Breslau 1916, 437–457.
5. Des baerischen Franziskanerpaters Ladislaus May Reise in das Heiilge Land (1748–1753). Von Dr. Georg Reismüller, Kustos an der Staatsbibliothek München. (Mit 3 Bildern.) In: Das Bayernland. 30.1919, 419–424.
6. Zur Geschichte der chinesischen Büchersammlung der Bayerischen Staatsbibliothek. Von Georg Reismüller. In: Ostasiatische Zeitschrift. 8.1919/20, 331–336.
7. Auszug aus der Denkschrift des Oberbibliothekars Dr. G. Reismüller über die Schaffung einer Pfälzischen Landesbibliothek, In Die Pfalz am Rhein. 5.1920, 24–28.
8. Die neue Pfälzische Landesbibliothek in Speye a. Rh. Referehnt. Bibl.-Dir. Dr. Georg Reismüller, Speyer, In. ZfB 39.1922, 335–340.
9. Ausblicke. Vom I. Vorsitzenden des Literarischen Vereins der Pfalz, Dr. Georg Reismüller, Speyer, In: Pfälz, Museum -Pfälz. Museum – Pfälz Heimatkunde. 39.1922, 171.
10. Dr. Reismüller: Die neue Pfälzische Landesbibliothek, In: Pfälz. Museum-Pfälz Heimatkunde. 40.1923, 1-8
11. Bibliotheksdirektor Dr. Georg Reismüller: Von der neuen Pfälzischen Landesbibliothek. In. Heimaterde. 1.1923, 13–17.
12. Planwirtschaft im pfälzischen Bibliothekswesen. Von Dr. G. Reismüller, Direktor der Pfälz. Landesbibliothek. In Pfalzkatalog III, Fa. E. Lincks-Crusius, Kaiserslautern 1924, 41–49.
13. Johann Michael Freys wissenschaftlicher Nachlaß in der Pfälzischen Landesbibliothek in Speyer. Von Bibliotheksdirekt. Dr. G. Reismüller, Speyer. In. Neuer Pfälzische Landeszeitung, Beilage Nr. 9 vom 27.9.1924, 7–8.
14. Martin Greif Handschriften in der Pfälzischen Landesbibliothek. Von Dr. G. Reismüller. In Palatina-Almanach. 1925. Speyer 1924, 46–50.
15. Speyer Büchersammler. Von Dr. G. Reismüller, Direktor der Pfälzischen Landesbibliothek in Speyer. In Das Bayernland. 36.1925, 289–295.
16. Pfälzische Büereien in Vergangenheit und Gegenwart. Von Bibliotheksdirektor Dr. Reismüller, Speyer [Quelle nicht erm.] 1925, 70–77.
17. Zur Geschichte der pfälzischen Mundarten. Dr. G. Reismüller. In: Pfälz. Museum. 42.1925, 181.
18. Die Zeitungsssammlung der Pfälzischen Landesbibliothek. Von Bibl.-Dir. Dr. G. Reismüller, Speyer, In Landauer Anzeiger, Nr. 102, 2.5.1925, 4.
19. Herzog Karl August und seine Bibliothek auf dem Karlsberg bei Homburg. Von Bibliotheksdirektor Dr. Reismüller, Speyer. In. Wissernschaft – Volksbildung, Beilage zur Neuen Pfälz. Landeszeitung. Nr. 17–20. 25.10.1925, 14–15.
20. Die Pfälzische Landesbibliothek in Speyer von 1. April 1923 bis 1. Sep. 1925, Von Bibliotheksdirektor Dr. Reismüller, In: Pfälz. Museum. 42.1925, 259–261.
21. Georg von Neumayers Bibliothek. Von Bibliotheksdirektor Dr. Reismülle. In: Pfälz. Museum, 43.1926, 111.
22. Zur Geschichte der naturwissenschaftlichen Bibliotheken in der Pfalz. Von Dr. Reismüller. In: Pfälz, Museum, 44,1927, 9-11.
23. Zensur und Zeitung in der Pfalz von hundert Jahren, Vor Dr. Reismüller-Speyer. In: Frankenthaler Tagblatt. 1.10.1927, Nr. 229.
24. 4 Jahre Pfälzische Lanesbibliothek, in: ZfB 1927, 514
25. Zehn Jahre Rheinlandbesetzung. Beschreibendes Verzeichnis des Schrifttums über die Westfragen im Einschluß des Saargebietes und Eupen-Malmedys. Von Dr. Georg Reismüller, Direktor der Pfälzischen Landesbibliothek Speyer und Dr. Josef Hofmann, Bibliothekar der Pfälzischen Landesbibliothek Speyer, Die selbständig erschinenen Schriften. Breslaud: Ferdinand Hirt 1929. XII, 371 S Vorwort, S. V. Gez.: Peking, Ende Januar 1929. Dr. Reismüller, Direktro der Pfälzischen Landesbibliothek.
26. Erfahrungen und Eindrücke aus ostasiatischen und amerikanischen Bibliotheken. Referent: Generaldirektor Dr. Georg Reismüller-München. In ZfB 47.1930, 469–473. Auszug aus dem Bericht.
27. [Über Leihverkehr.] In: ZFB. 47.1930, 463–465.
28. [Über den Gesamtkatalog.] In. ZfB. 47.1930, 505–506.
29. Das bayerische Bibliothekswesen in Vergangenheit und Gegenwart. Von Dr. Georg Reismüller, Generaldirektor der Bayerischen Staatsbibliothek. In. Dem bayerischen Volke. 1930, 131–139.
30. [Über Hilfsmagazine.] In: ZfB 48.1931, 414–417.
31. Brandfackeln in der Pfalz, Josef Pontens neuer Roman »Rhein und Wolga«. Von Dr. Georg Reismüller, Generaldirektor der Bayerischen Staatsbibliothek. In: Münchner Neuste Nachrichten? 345: 19.12.1931.
32. Zur Vorgeschichte des Neubaus der Bayerischen Staatsbibliothek. Eine Säkularerinnerung an die Grundsteinlegung am 8. Juli 1832. Von Dr. Georg Reismüller, Generaldirektor der Bayerischen Staatsbibliothek, München. In. Das Bayernland. 43.1932, 387–392.
33. Hundert Jahr e Bayerische Staatsbibliothek im Dienste der Wissenschaft vom Orient. Von Generaldirektor Dr. Georg Reismüller, München. In Das Bayernland. 43.1932, 409–414.
34. Goethe und die bayerische Gelehrtenpolitik seiner Zeit. Von Generaldirektor Dr. Georg Reismüller, München. In: Das Bayernland. 43.1932, 142–153.
35. [Über den Gesamtkatalog.] In.ZfB 50.1933, 589–590.

== Secondary literature ==
- Kürschners Gelehrten-Kalender 5.1935,1098 [ohne Angabe von Publ.].
- Geldner, Ferdinand: Dr. Georg Reismüller – ein Lebensbild. In: Ingoldstädter Heimatblätter. 1953, 27–28.
- Meier, Franz-Joseph: Aus der Geschichte der Asia Major-Bestände-der Bayer-Staatsbibliothek und ihrer Bearbeitung. In. *Orientalisches aus Münchner Bibliotheken und Sammlungen, München 1957, 39–59, spez 46–48, foto Taf.21.
- Schottenloher, Karl: Die Bayern in der Fremde, München Beck 1959, Nr. 757
- Bosl's Bayerische Biographie. Ingolstadt 1983, 625.
- Ein nur unbedeutender Nachlaßteil Reismüllers is vor einigen Jahren an die Bayerische Staatsbibliothek gelangt. Er gibt aber über die hier behandelten Fragen keine nähere Auskunft.

== Press Review ==
- On the Change of Directorate General and the Financial Misery of the Bayerische Staatsbibliothek, 1928–1932
- Wie hälts du's mit der Religion? Die Besetzung bayerischer Staatsstellen/R.H. In VZ 453:25.09.1928.
- Ein interessanter Fall. Die Vorgänge in der Bayerischen Staatsbibliothek. In: F 790: 21.10.1928, 2.
- Die Vorgänge in der Bayerischen Staatszeitung. In. Bayer, Kurier 299: 25.10.1928, 3. – Münchern Stadtzeitung. 295: 24.10.1928, 7. – Bayerische Staatszeitung 247: 24.10.1928, 2–3.
- Um die Leitung der Bayerischen Staatsbibliothek: In: Augsburger Postzeitung. 255: 6.11.1928, 5.
- Der Generaldirektorsposten and er Bayerischen Staatsbibliothek, Inn: MNN 304: 7.11.1928, 4.
- Ist es denn wahr? Zum Notstand unserer Staatsbibliothek. Von Karl Wolfskehrl. In MNN? 59:1.3.1929.
- Geist ohne Geld! Ein Hilferuf der Staatsbibliothek. In Süddeutsche Sonntatgspost. 15: 14.4.1929, 10.
- Der Rückgang der Staatsbibliothek. Debatte im Haushaltsausschuß. In Münchner Telegramm Zeigung. 72: 16.4.1929, 1.
- Kulturpolitik in Bayern. III. In: Münchner Post, 102: 3.5.1929, 3.
- Staatsbibliothek und Korporationswesen, In: Bayer. Kurier. 127: 7.5.1929, 3.
- Kulturpolitik in Bayern. In: NZZ 889: 9.5.1929, Bl.4.
- Die Bayerische Staatsbibliothek und die Kunststadt München. In. MNN 132: 16.5.1929, 5.
- Palastrevolution in der Staatsbibliothek. In Bayer Kurier. 141; 21.5.1929, 2.
- Der Kampf um die Staatsbibliothek. Die Hetze des Bayer. Kurier und der Augsburger Postzeitung, In: VB 123:30./315.1929.
- Sonderbare Geschichten aus der Staatsbibliothek, In. Augsburger Postzeitung. 119, 28.5.1929,5.
- Bayerische Gelehrtenarbeit in Ostasien. Dr. Reismüller Bücher Erwerbungen in China und Japan. In. MNN 161: 16.61929, 2 [18500 Bde].
- Ernüchterung. In: Bayer Kurier. 170: 19.6.1929, 3.
- »Skrupelloser Zuträger ...« In Münchner Beobachter (Tägl. Beiblatt zum V.B.). 141: 21.6.1929.
- Wechsel in der Leitung der Staatsbibliothek. In. MNN? 214: 8.8.1929. – Rhein. Volksblatt [Speyer] 183 : 8.8.1929.
- Der neue Generaldirektor der Staatsbibliothek. In Bayer. Kurier. 221: 9.8.1929, 4.
- Generaldirektor der Bayerischen Staatsbibliothek/Dr. E. In: MNN? 215: 9.8.1929.
- Die Leitung der Bayerischen Staatsbibliothek/ – er. In Bayer. Staatszeitung. 184: 11./12.8.1929, 2.
- [foto Reismüller.] In: Süddeutsche Sonntagspost, 32: 11.8.1929, 5.
- Eine Abwehrstelle gegen Dummheit. Die Beratungsstelle der Volksbücherei in München. Dr. Sy. In Münchner SS-Sontags-Anzeiger. 43: 26.10.1930, 3 [Mit Foto Reismüller].
- Nachtgespräch vor der Staatsbibliothek. Eine Parabel/Dr. A. M[einer?] in : Münchner Post. 17: 22.1.1931, 2.
- Ein Wort für die Staatsbibliothek. In. Bayer. Staatszeitung, 50: 1./2. 3. 1931, 4.
- Drahtverhau im Treppenhaus der Staatsbibliothek. In: Münchner Stadt-Anzeiger. 63: 4.3.1931, 5.
- Der Verfall der Staatsbibliothek. Von Joseph Bernhart. In: MNN 90: 3.4.1931.
- Um den guten Ruf der Staatsbibliothek. In. Das Bayerische Vaterland. Nr. 99-102. 1931.
- Dr. Georg Reismüller [50 Jahre]. In: MNN? Nr. 126: 10.5.1932.
- Jahre bayerische Büchereidiesnt. In: Bayer. Staatszeitung. 108: 12.5.1932, 2.
- Im Bergwerk der Bücher. 100 Jahre Staatsbibliothek an der Ludwigstraße Effi Horn. In: Münchner Telegrafen Zeitung. 116: 21./22.5.1932,2.

»Der bekannte China-Forscher ...« in: MNN 310: 14.11.1932, 2.

== Abbreviations, Press Review ==
- F – Frankfurter Zeitung;
- MNN – Münchner Neueste Nachrichten
- NZZ – Neue Zürcher Zeitung
- VB – Völkischer Beobachter
- VZ – Vossische Zeitung
