= Vulgar Latin =

Non-standard Latin spoken in ancient Rome

- sermo vulgaris
- Era: Developed into various Romance languages by the 9th century
- Language family: Indo-European: Italic; Latino-Faliscan; Latin; Vulgar Latin
- Early forms: Proto-Indo-European: Proto-Italic; Proto-Latino-Faliscan; Old Latin
- Writing system: Latin

Language codes
- ISO 639-3: –
- Glottolog: vulg1234
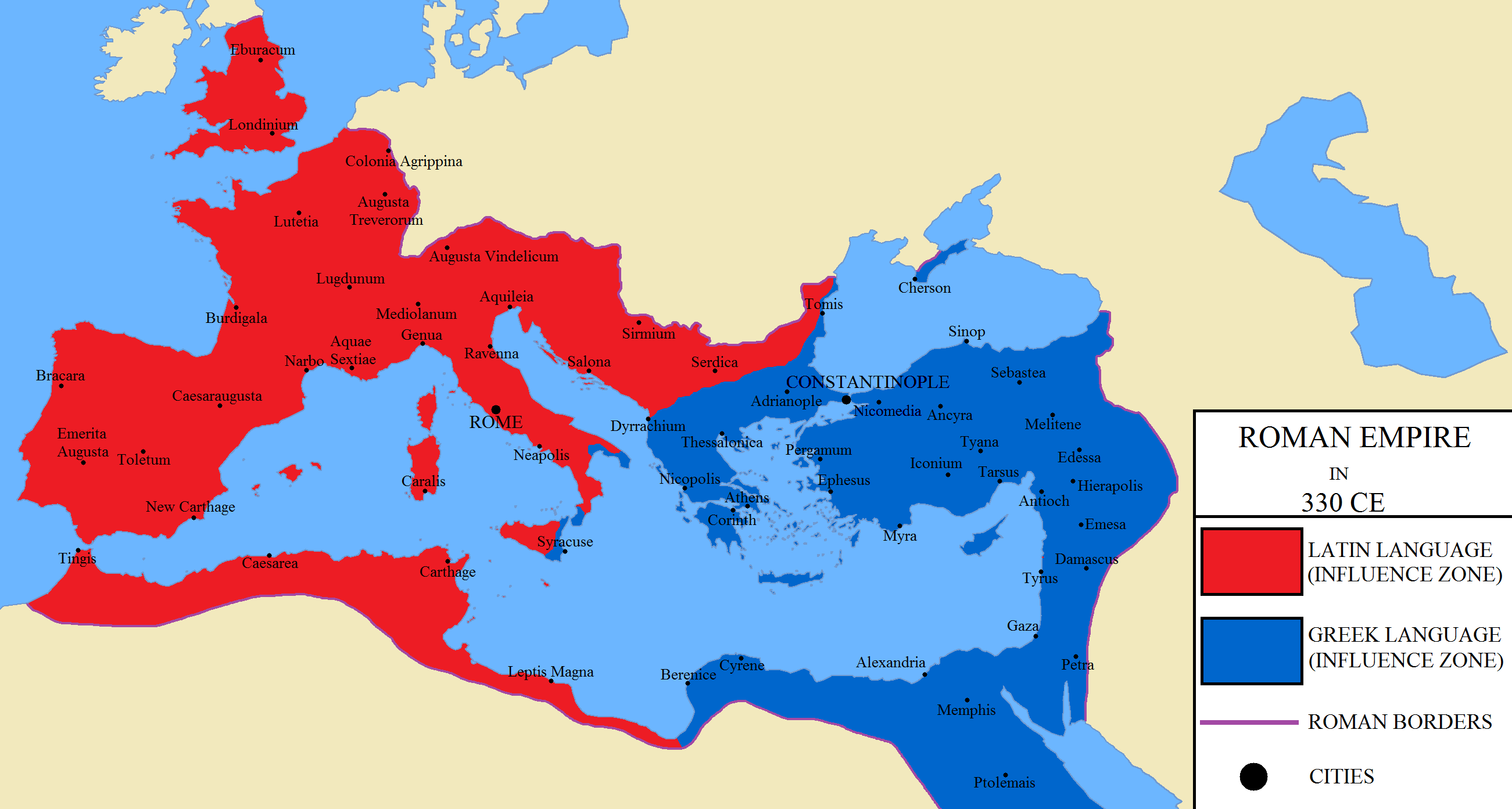
- Latin-speaking or otherwise heavily Latin-influenced areas in the Later Roman Empire, highlighted in red

Vulgar Latin, also known as Colloquial, Popular, Spoken or Vernacular Latin, is the range of non-formal registers of Latin spoken from the Late Roman Republic onward. Latin was in conversational use across many centuries, in many locations, and in various contexts. Thus, Vulgar Latin as a term is both controversial and imprecise, with scholars differing in opinion as to the extent of the differences from Classical Latin and whether this broad umbrella was in some sense a distinct language or speech variety. At its extreme, the theory of a separate Vulgar Latin, first developed in the early 19th century by the French linguist François-Just-Marie Raynouard, suggested that the common speech differed from the written register that formed an elite language of its own, but this is now rejected.

The current scholarly consensus is that the written and spoken languages formed a continuum, much as they do in any language, with speech tending to evolve faster than the written language, and the written, formalised language exerting conservative pressure back on speech. The term Vulgar Latin is used in different ways by different scholars, applied to indicate spoken Latin of differing types, or from different social classes and time periods. Nevertheless, the shifts in the spoken forms remain very important to understanding the transition from Latin or Late Latin to Proto-Romance and Romance languages. To make matters more complicated, evidence for spoken forms can be found only through examination of written Classical Latin, Late Latin, or early Romance, depending on the time period.

== History of controversy ==
During the Classical period, Roman authors referred to the informal, everyday variety of their own language as sermo plebeius or sermo vulgaris, meaning "common speech". This could simply refer to unadorned speech without the use of rhetoric, or even plain speech. The modern usage of the term "Vulgar Latin" dates to the Renaissance, when Italian humanists and Renaissance scholars began to theorize that their own language originated in a sort of "corrupted" Latin that they assumed formed an entity distinct from the literary Classical variety, though opinions differed greatly on the nature of this "vulgar" dialect.

The early 19th-century French linguist François-Just-Marie Raynouard is often regarded as the father of modern Romance philology. Observing that the Romance languages have many features in common that are not found in Latin, at least not in "proper" or Classical Latin, he concluded that the former must have all had some common ancestor (which he believed most closely resembled Old Occitan) that replaced Latin some time before the year 1000. This he dubbed la langue romane or "the Romance language".

The first truly modern treatise on Romance linguistics and the first to apply the comparative method was Friedrich Christian Diez's seminal Grammar of the Romance Languages. Researchers such as Wilhelm Meyer-Lübke characterised Vulgar Latin as, to a great extent, a separate language that was more or less distinct from the written form. To Meyer-Lübke, the spoken Vulgar form was the genuine and continuous form, while Classical Latin was a kind of artificial idealised language imposed upon it; thus Romance languages were derived from the "real" Vulgar form, which had to be reconstructed from remaining evidence. Others that followed this approach divided Vulgar from Classical Latin by education or class. Other views of "Vulgar Latin" include defining it as uneducated speech, slang, or in effect, Proto-Romance.

The result is that the term "Vulgar Latin" is regarded by some modern philologists as essentially meaningless, but unfortunately very persistent:

the continued use of "Vulgar Latin" is not only no aid to thought, but is, on the contrary, a positive barrier to a clear understanding of Latin and Romance....

I wish it were possible to hope the term might fall out of use. Many scholars have stated that "Vulgar Latin" is a useless and dangerously misleading term ... To abandon it once and for all can only benefit scholarship.

Lloyd called to replace the use of "Vulgar Latin" with a series of more precise definitions, such as the spoken Latin of a particular time and place.

Research in the 20th century has in any case shifted the view to consider the differences between written and spoken Latin in more moderate terms. Just as in modern languages, speech patterns are different from written forms, and vary with education, the same can be said of Latin. For instance, philologist József Herman agrees that the term is problematic, and therefore limits it in his work to mean the innovations and changes that turn up in spoken or written Latin that were relatively uninfluenced by educated forms of Latin. Herman states:

it is completely clear from the texts during the time that Latin was a living language, there was never an unbridgeable gap between the written and spoken, nor between the language of the social elites and that of the middle, lower, or disadvantaged groups of the same society.

Herman also makes it clear that Vulgar Latin, in this view, is a varied and unstable phenomenon, crossing many centuries of usage where any generalisations are bound to cover up variations and differences.

== Sources ==
Evidence for the features of non-literary Latin comes from the following sources:

- Explicit mention of certain constructions or pronunciation habits by Roman grammarians.
- Recurrent grammatical, syntactic, or orthographic mistakes in Latin epigraphy.
  - Curse tablets, as a special kind of inscription.
- The insertion, whether intentional or not, of colloquial terms or constructions into contemporary texts. Special interest is given to:
  - Private letters and documents from an ordinary context such as business records, lists and school exercises; these are rare but papyri from Egypt and tablets from Hadrian's Wall have been found.
  - Technical works on medicine, agriculture, and similar disciplines, where the demand for grammatical accuracy was lower, such as the Mulomedicina Chironis, a veterinary treatise.
  - Christian texts, as many originated from marginalised communities; including early Bible translations and funeral inscriptions.
  - Late Latin texts from the sixth century onwards, which show changes, or the absence thereof, in local Latin under the influence of new educational practices and social structures.
- The pronunciation of Roman-era lexical borrowings into neighboring languages such as Basque, Albanian, or Welsh.
- Modern Romance languages, the comparative analysis of which can be used to validate or disprove hypotheses about earlier changes in spoken Latin.

== Fragmentation ==
An oft-posed question is why (or when, or how) Latin "fragmented" into several different languages. As literary evidence suggests, the spread of spoken or "Vulgar Latin" became more and more intensive over time in major provinces of the Roman Empire (such as Britannia, Dalmatia, Gallia Narbonensis, Lusitania, Moesia, Pannonia, and Venetia et Histria), although to a varying degree in each one of them. Current hypotheses contrast the centralizing and homogenizing socio-economic, cultural, and political forces that characterized the Roman Empire with the centrifugal forces that prevailed afterwards.

By the end of the 1st century CE, the Romans had seized the entire Mediterranean Basin and established hundreds of colonies in the conquered provinces. Over time this—along with other factors that encouraged linguistic and cultural assimilation, such as political unity, frequent travel and commerce, military service, etc.—led to Latin becoming the predominant language throughout the western Mediterranean. Latin itself was subject to the same assimilatory tendencies, such that its varieties had probably become more uniform by the time the Empire fell than they had been before it. That is not to say that the language had been static for all those years, but rather that ongoing changes tended to spread to all regions.

The rise of the first Arab caliphate in the 7th century marked the definitive end of Roman dominance over the Mediterranean. It is from approximately that century onward that regional differences proliferate in Latin documents, revealing the fragmentation of Latin into the incipient Romance languages. Until then Latin appears to have been remarkably homogeneous, as far as can be judged from its written records, although careful statistical analysis reveals regional differences in the treatment of the vowel /ĭ/, and in the frequency of the merger of (original) intervocalic /b/ and /w/, by about the fifth century CE.

== Phonological development ==
=== Consonantism ===
==== Loss of nasals ====
- Word-final /m/ was lost in polysyllabic words. In monosyllables it tended to survive as /n/.
- /n/ was usually lost before fricatives, resulting in compensatory lengthening of the preceding vowel (e.g. sponsa 'fiancée' > spōsa).

==== Palatalization ====
Front vowels in hiatus (after a consonant and before another vowel) became [j], which palatalized preceding consonants.

==== Fricativization ====
/w/ (except after /k/) and intervocalic /b/ merge as the bilabial fricative /β/.

==== Simplification of consonant clusters ====
- The cluster /nkt/ reduced to [ŋt].
- /kw/ delabialized to /k/ before back vowels.
- /ks/ before or after a consonant, or at the end of a word, reduced to /s/.

=== Vocalism ===
==== Monophthongization ====
- /ae̯/ and /oe̯/ monophthongized to [ɛː] and [eː] respectively by around the second century AD.

==== Loss of vowel quantity ====
The system of phonemic vowel length collapsed by the 5th century CE (see also Long I § History), leaving quality differences as the distinguishing factor between vowels; the paradigm thus changed from /ī ĭ ē ĕ ā ă ŏ ō ŭ ū/ to /i ɪ e ɛ a ɔ o ʊ u/ with no distinction between original /a/ and /aː/. Concurrently, stressed vowels in open syllables lengthened.

==== Loss of near-close front vowel ====
Towards the end of the Roman Empire /ɪ/ merged with /e/ in most regions, although not in Africa or a few peripheral areas in Italy.

== Grammar ==
=== Romance articles ===
It is difficult to place the point in which the definite article, absent in Latin but present in all Romance languages, arose, largely because the highly colloquial speech in which it arose was seldom written down until the daughter languages had strongly diverged; most surviving texts in early Romance show the articles fully developed.

Definite articles evolved from demonstrative pronouns or adjectives (an analogous development is found in many Indo-European languages, including Greek, Celtic, and Germanic); compare the fate of the Latin demonstrative adjective ille, illa, illud "that", in the Romance languages, becoming French le and la (Old French li, lo, la), Catalan and Spanish el, la and lo, Occitan lo and la, Portuguese and Galician o and a (elision of -l- is a common feature of Galician-Portuguese) and Italian il, lo and la. Sardinian went its own way here also, forming its article from ipse, ipsa an intensive adjective (su, sa); some Catalan and Occitan dialects have articles from the same source. While most of the Romance languages put the article before the noun, Romanian has its own way, by putting the article after the noun, e.g. lupul ("the wolf" – from *lupum illum) and omul ("the man" – *homo illum), possibly a result of being within the Balkan sprachbund.

The term ille may have evolved from its initial demonstrative function, broadening to convey semantic prominence by directing the attention of the audience towards particular referents which the speaker intended to highlight. This usage of the term is found in the Itinerarium Egeriae, which recounts the travels of the Christian pilgrim—and the author—Egeria: the author utilizes the demonstrative to mark words that are crucial to the meaning of the text. For instance, when noting the location of a cave by a church, Egeria clarifies that she is referring to "ipsa ecclesia" ("that church"). The usage of ille typically occurs alongside nouns that have previously been identified with the text: Egeria, when describing a church near Mount Olivet, initially describes it merely as an "ecclesia," but later refers to it as "ipsa ecclesia." The usage of the demonstratives to denote prominent parts of discourse may have predicated the eventual transformation of the term into a definite article. Once speakers began prefacing sentences with the term, they began utilizing it in a manner similar to an article; therefore, the article-like features of the word eventually become normalized and then incorporated into the standard grammar of the language.

In Late Latin writings, ille was often used by writers in relative clauses to establish the identity of subjects not previously mentioned in the text. The 7th-century Chronicle of Fredegar clarifies that it is discussing "homines illos" ("those men") before introducing a relative clause in which they are the subject. During this time period, the term also developed anaphoric functions as an extension of the original demonstrative usage: Late Latin authors would substitute more basic mentions of a referent with ille and added more descriptive information. For instance, the Chronicle of Fredegar refers to a "regina" ("queen") as "illam parentem Francorum," meaning "that relative of the Franks". From this usage of the ille, in which it functioned help identify a specific referent, the term may have generalized to adopt more features associated with definite articles. One example of such a development appears in the writings of the 6th-century Gallo-Roman historian Gregory of Tours, who wrote "Ductus itaque sanctus Eugenius ad regem, cum illo Arrianorum episcopo pro fide catholica decertavit," meaning "The holy Eugenius was led to the king, and debated with that Arrian bishop in defense of the Catholic faith." Within this passage, the ablative form of the pronoun, illo, is utilized to denote the Arrian bishop, however it appears to function for more like the English article "the" rather than the original Classical Latin ille: the sentence could be understood equally as well if rendered as "The holy Eugenius was led to the king, and debated with the Arrian bishop in defense of the Catholic faith." Another indication of the weakening of the demonstratives can be inferred from the fact that at this time, legal and similar texts begin to swarm with praedictus, supradictus, and so forth (all meaning, essentially, "aforesaid"), which seem to mean little more than "this" or "that". Gregory of Tours writes, Erat autem... beatissimus Anianus in supradicta civitate episcopus ("Blessed Anianus was bishop in that city.") The original Latin demonstrative adjectives were no longer felt to be strong or specific enough.

The Latin pronoun ipse, which was initially used to emphasize specific referents, also developed functions similar to a definite article. However, it retained some of its original emphatic properties: it was also used anaphorically to highlight prominent referents. In one 9th–10th century text from the Diocese of Urgell they utilize the phrase ipsa ecclesia to identify the church the entire paragraph referred to while identifying a unique river, not mentioned previously in the text, as "illo ribo" ("that river"). Alongside its emphatic usage, the original Classical Latin ipse was also used to clarify referents if the text risked introducing ambiguity regarding the subjects and objects involved. However, in Late Latin literature ipse appears in scenarios in which its presence was not necessary: In the Chronicle of Fredegar, a character is introduced as "Waiofarium" ("Waiofar) before—in the next sentence—being described as "ipsum Waiofarium" ("the very same Waiofar"). Other documents suggest that ipse and ille may have eventually assumed practically identical meanings: the 11th–12th century text, the Cartulario de Sant Cugat del Vallés utilizes both terms like definite articles, mentioning "ipsum mansum" and "illum mansum," both meaning "the authority."

In the less formal speech, reconstructed forms suggest that the inherited Latin demonstratives were made more forceful by being compounded with ecce (originally an interjection: "behold!"), which also spawned Italian ecco through eccum, a contracted form of ecce eum. This is the origin of Old French cil (*ecce ille), cist (*ecce iste) and ici (*ecce hic); Italian questo (*eccum istum), quello (*eccum illum) and (now mainly Tuscan) codesto (*eccum tibi istum), as well as qui (*eccu hic), qua (*eccum hac); Spanish and Occitan aquel and Portuguese aquele (*eccum ille); Spanish acá and Portuguese cá (*eccum hac); Spanish aquí and Portuguese aqui (*eccum hic); Portuguese acolá (*eccum illac) and aquém (*eccum inde); Romanian acest (*ecce iste) and acela (*ecce ille), and many other forms.

On the other hand, even in the Oaths of Strasbourg, dictated in Old French in AD 842, no demonstrative appears even in places where one would clearly be called for in all the later languages (pro christian poblo – "for the Christian people"). Using the demonstratives as articles may have still been considered overly informal for a royal oath in the 9th century. Considerable variation exists in all of the Romance vernaculars as to their actual use: in Romanian, the articles are suffixed to the noun (or an adjective preceding it), as in other languages of the Balkan sprachbund and the North Germanic languages.

The numeral unus, una (one) supplies the indefinite article in all cases (again, this is a common semantic development across Europe). This is anticipated in Classical Latin; Cicero writes cum uno gladiatore nequissimo ("with a most immoral gladiator"). This suggests that unus was beginning to supplant quidam in the meaning of "a certain" or "some" by the 1st century BC.

=== Loss of neuter gender ===
1st and 2nd adjectival declension paradigm in Classical Latin: e.g. altus ("tall") Excludes vocative.
	singular			plural		
	masculine	neuter	feminine	masculine	neuter	feminine
nominative	altus	altum	alta	altī	alta	altae
accusative	altum		altam	altōs	alta	altās
dative	altō		altae	altīs		
ablative	altō		altā	altīs		
genitive	altī		altae	altōrum		altārum

The three grammatical genders of Classical Latin were replaced by a two-gender system in most Romance languages.

The neuter gender of classical Latin was in most cases identical with the masculine both syntactically and morphologically. The confusion had already started in Pompeian graffiti, e.g. cadaver mortuus for cadaver mortuum ("dead body"), and hoc locum for hunc locum ("this place"). The morphological confusion shows primarily in the adoption of the nominative ending -us (-Ø after -r) in the o-declension.

In Petronius's work, one can find balneus for balneum ("bath"), fatus for fatum ("fate"), caelus for caelum ("heaven"), amphitheater for amphitheatrum ("amphitheatre"), vinus for vinum ("wine"), and conversely, thesaurum for thesaurus ("treasure"). Most of these forms occur in the speech of one man: Trimalchion, an uneducated Greek (i.e. foreign) freedman.

In modern Romance languages, the nominative s-ending has been largely abandoned, and all substantives of the o-declension have an ending derived from -um: -u, -o, or -Ø. E.g., masculine murus ("wall"), and neuter caelum ("sky") have evolved to: Italian muro, cielo; Portuguese muro, céu; Spanish muro, cielo, Catalan mur, cel; Romanian mur, cieru>cer; French mur, ciel. However, Old French still had -s in the nominative and -Ø in the accusative in both words: murs, ciels [nominative] – mur, ciel [oblique]. (Note: In a few isolated masculine nouns, the s has been either preserved or reinstated in the modern languages, for example FILIUS ("son") > French fils, DEUS ("god") > Spanish dios and Portuguese deus, and particularly in proper names: Spanish Carlos, Marcos, in the conservative orthography of French Jacques, Charles, Jules, etc.)

For some neuter nouns of the third declension, the oblique stem was productive; for others, the nominative/accusative form (the two were identical in Classical Latin). Evidence suggests that the neuter gender was under pressure well back into the imperial period. French (le) lait, Catalan (la) llet, Occitan (lo) lach, Spanish (la) leche, Portuguese (o) leite, Italian language (il) latte, Leonese (el) lleche and Romanian lapte(le) ("milk"), all derive from the non-standard but attested Latin nominative/accusative neuter lacte or accusative masculine lactem. In Spanish the word became feminine, while in French, Portuguese and Italian it became masculine (in Romanian it remained neuter, lapte/lăpturi). Other neuter forms, however, were preserved in Romance; Catalan and French nom, Leonese, Portuguese and Italian nome, Romanian nume ("name") all preserve the Latin nominative/accusative nomen, rather than the oblique stem form *nomin- (which nevertheless produced Spanish nombre).

Typical Italian endings
	Nouns		Adjectives and determiners	
	singular	plural	singular	plural
masculine	giardino	giardini	buono	buoni
feminine	donna	donne	buona	buone
neuter	uovo	uova	buono	buone

Most neuter nouns had plural forms ending in -A or -IA; some of these were reanalysed as feminine singulars, such as gaudium ("joy"), plural gaudia; the plural form lies at the root of the French feminine singular (la) joie, as well as of Catalan and Occitan (la) joia (Italian la gioia is a borrowing from French); the same for lignum ("wood stick"), plural ligna, that originated the Catalan feminine singular noun (la) llenya, Portuguese (a) lenha, Spanish (la) leña and Italian (la) legna. Some Romance languages still have a special form derived from the ancient neuter plural which is treated grammatically as feminine: e.g., BRACCHIUM: BRACCHIA "arm(s)" → Italian (il) braccio: (le) braccia, Romanian braț(ul): brațe(le). Cf. also Merovingian Latin ipsa animalia aliquas mortas fuerant.

Alternations in Italian heteroclitic nouns such as l'uovo fresco ("the fresh egg") / le uova fresche ("the fresh eggs") are usually analysed as masculine in the singular and feminine in the plural, with an irregular plural in -a. However, it is also consistent with their historical development to say that uovo is simply a regular neuter noun (ovum, plural ova) and that the characteristic ending for words agreeing with these nouns is -o in the singular and -e in the plural. The same alternation in gender exists in certain Romanian nouns, but is considered regular as it is more common than in Italian. Thus, a relict neuter gender can arguably be said to persist in Italian and Romanian.

In Portuguese, traces of the neuter plural can be found in collective formations and words meant to inform a bigger size or sturdiness. Thus, one can use ovo(s) ("egg(s)") and ova(s) ("roe", "collection(s) of eggs"), bordo(s) ("section(s) of an edge") and borda(s) ("edge(s)"), saco(s) ("bag(s)") and saca(s) ("sack(s)"), manto(s) ("cloak(s)") and manta(s) ("blanket(s)"). Other times, it resulted in words whose gender may be changed more or less arbitrarily, like fruto / fruta ("fruit"), caldo / calda ("broth"), etc.

These formations were especially common when they could be used to avoid irregular forms. In Latin, the names of trees were usually feminine, but many were declined in the second declension paradigm, which was dominated by masculine or neuter nouns. Latin pirus ("pear tree"), a feminine noun with a masculine-looking ending, became masculine in Italian (il) pero and Romanian păr(ul); in French and Spanish it was replaced by the masculine derivations (le) poirier, (el) peral; and in Portuguese and Catalan by the feminine derivations (a) pereira, (la) perera.

As usual, irregularities persisted longest in frequently used forms. From the fourth declension noun manus ("hand"), another feminine noun with the ending -us, Italian and Spanish derived (la) mano, Romanian mânu>mână, pl. mâini / (reg.) mâni, Catalan (la) mà, and Portuguese (a) mão, which preserve the feminine gender along with the masculine appearance.

Except for the Italian and Romanian heteroclitic nouns, other major Romance languages have no trace of neuter nouns, but still have neuter pronouns. French celui-ci / celle-ci / ceci ("this"), Spanish éste / ésta / esto ("this"), Italian: gli / le / ci ("to him" /"to her" / "to it"), Catalan: ho, açò, això, allò ("it" / this / this-that / that over there); Portuguese: todo / toda / tudo ("all of him" / "all of her" / "all of it").

In Spanish, a three-way contrast is also made with the definite articles el, la, and lo. The last is used with nouns denoting abstract categories: lo bueno, literally "that which is good", from bueno: good.

=== Loss of oblique cases ===
The Vulgar Latin vowel shifts caused the merger of several case endings in the nominal and adjectival declensions. Some of the causes include: the loss of final m, the merger of ă with ā, and the merger of ŭ with ō (see tables). Thus, by the 5th century, the number of case contrasts had been drastically reduced.

Evolution of a 1st declension noun: caepa/cēpa ("onion") (feminine singular)
	Classical (c. 1st century)	Vulgar (c. 5th cent.)	Modern Romanian
nominative	caepa, cēpa	*cépa	ceapă
accusative	caepam, cēpam	*cépa	ceapă
ablative	caepā, cēpā	*cépa	ceapă
dative	caepae, cēpae	*cépe	cepe
genitive	caepae, cēpae	*cépe	cepe

Evolution of a 2nd declension noun: mūrus ("wall") (masculine singular)
	Classical (c. 1st cent.)	Vulgar (c. 5th cent.)	Old French (c. 11th cent.)
nominative	mūrus	*múros	murs
accusative	mūrum	*múru	mur
ablative	mūrō	*múro	mur
dative	mūrō	*múro	mur
genitive	mūrī	*múri	mur

There also seems to be a marked tendency to confuse different forms even when they had not become homophonous (like the generally more distinct plurals), which indicates that nominal declension was shaped not only by phonetic mergers, but also by structural factors. As a result of the untenability of the noun case system after these phonetic changes, Vulgar Latin shifted from a markedly synthetic language to a more analytic one.

The genitive case died out around the 3rd century AD, according to Meyer-Lübke, and began to be replaced by "de" + noun (which originally meant "about/concerning", weakened to "of") as early as the 2nd century BC. Exceptions of remaining genitive forms are some pronouns, certain fossilized expressions and some proper names. For example, French jeudi ("Thursday") < Old French juesdi < Vulgar Latin "jovis diēs"; Spanish es menester ("it is necessary") < "est ministeri"; and Italian terremoto ("earthquake") < "terrae motu" as well as names like Paoli, Pieri.

The dative case lasted longer than the genitive, even though Plautus, in the 2nd century BC, already shows some instances of substitution by the construction "ad" + accusative. For example, "ad carnuficem dabo".

The accusative case developed as a prepositional case, displacing many instances of the ablative. Towards the end of the imperial period, the accusative came to be used more and more as a general oblique case.

Despite increasing case mergers, nominative and accusative forms seem to have remained distinct for much longer, since they are rarely confused in inscriptions. Even though Gaulish texts from the 7th century rarely confuse both forms, it is believed that both cases began to merge in Africa by the end of the empire, and a bit later in parts of Italy and Iberia. Nowadays, Romanian maintains a two-case system, while Old French and Old Occitan had a two-case subject-oblique system.

This Old French system was based largely on whether or not the Latin case ending contained an "s" or not, with the "s" being retained but all vowels in the ending being lost (as with veisin below). But since this meant that it was easy to confuse the singular nominative with the plural oblique, and the plural nominative with the singular oblique, this case system ultimately collapsed as well, and Middle French adopted one case (usually the oblique) for all purposes.

Today, Romanian is generally considered the only Romance language with a surviving case system. However, some dialects of Romansh retain a special predicative form of the masculine singular identical to the plural: il bien vin ("the good wine") vs. il vin ei buns ("the wine is good"). This "predicative case" (as it is sometimes called) is a remnant of the Latin nominative in -us.

Evolution of a masculine noun in Old French: veisin ("neighbor"). (definite article in parentheses).
		Classical Latin (1st cent.)	Old French (11th cent.)
singular	nominative	"vīcīnus"	(li) veisins
singular	accusative	"vīcīnum"	(le) veisin
singular	genitive	"vīcīnī"	(le) veisin
singular	dative	"vīcīnō"	(le) veisin
singular	ablative	"vīcīnō"	(le) veisin
plural	nominative	"vīcīnī"	(li) veisin
plural	accusative	"vīcīnōs"	(les) veisins
plural	genitive	"vīcīnōrum"	(les) veisins
plural	dative	"vīcīnīs"	(les) veisins
plural	ablative	"vīcīnīs"	(les) veisins

=== Wider use of prepositions ===
The loss of a productive noun case system meant that the syntactic purposes it formerly served now had to be performed by prepositions and other paraphrases. These particles increased in number, and many new ones were formed by compounding old ones. The descendant Romance languages are full of grammatical particles such as Spanish donde, "where", from Latin de + unde (which in Romanian literally means "from where"/"where from"), or French dès, "since", from de + ex, while the equivalent Spanish and Portuguese desde is de + ex + de. Spanish después and Portuguese depois, "after", represent de + ex + post.

Some of these new compounds appear in literary texts during the late empire; French dehors, Spanish de fuera and Portuguese de fora ("outside") all represent de + foris (Romanian afară – ad + foris), and we find Jerome writing stulti, nonne qui fecit, quod de foris est, etiam id, quod de intus est fecit? (Luke 11.40: "ye fools, did not he, that made which is without, make that which is within also?"). In some cases, compounds were created by combining a large number of particles, such as the Romanian adineauri ("just recently") from ad + de + in + illa + hora.

Classical Latin:

Marcus patrī librum dat. "Marcus is giving [his] father [a/the] book."

Vulgar Latin:

*Marcos dal‿libru ap‿patre. "Marcus is giving [a/the] book to [his] father."

Just as in the disappearing dative case, colloquial Latin sometimes replaced the disappearing genitive case with the preposition de followed by the ablative, then eventually the accusative (oblique).

Classical Latin:

Marcus mihi librum patris dat. "Marcus is giving me [his] father's book.

Vulgar Latin:

*Marcos me(βe) da libru de patre. "Marcus is giving me [the] book of [his] father."

=== Pronouns ===
Unlike in the nominal and adjectival inflections, pronouns kept a great part of the case distinctions. However, many changes happened. For example, the /ɡ/ of ego was lost by the end of the empire, and eo appears in manuscripts from the 6th century.

Reconstructed pronominal system of Vulgar Latin
	1st person		2nd person		3rd person
	singular	plural	singular	plural	3rd person
Nominative	*éo	*nọs	*tu	*vọs	
Dative	*mi	*nọ́be(s)	*ti, *tẹ́be	*vọ́be(s)	*si, *sẹ́be
Accusative	*mẹ	*nọs	*tẹ	*vọs	*sẹ

=== Adverbs ===
Classical Latin had a number of different suffixes that made adverbs from adjectives: cārus, "dear", formed cārē, "dearly"; ācriter, "fiercely", from ācer; crēbrō, "often", from crēber. All of these derivational suffixes were lost in Vulgar Latin.

An alternative formation with a feminine ablative form modifying mente (originally the ablative of mēns, and so meaning "with a ... mind") gave rise to a widespread rule for forming adverbs in many Romance languages: adding the suffix -ment(e) to the feminine form of the adjective. So vēlōx ("quick") instead of vēlōciter ("quickly") gave veloci mente (originally "with a quick mind", "quick-mindedly"), and -mente became a productive suffix for forming adverbs in Romance such as Italian chiaramente, Spanish claramente 'clearly'. The development of an originally autonomous form (the noun mente, meaning 'mind') into a suffix (although remaining in free lexical use in other contexts e.g. Italian venire in mente 'come to mind') is a textbook case of grammaticalization.

=== Verbs ===
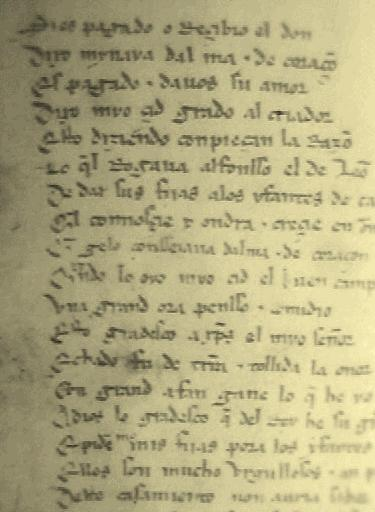
The Cantar de Mio Cid (Song of my Cid) is the earliest Spanish text

In general, the verbal system in the Romance languages changed less from Classical Latin than did the nominal system.

The four conjugational classes generally survived. The second and third conjugations already had identical imperfect tense forms in Latin, and also shared a common present participle. Because of the merging of short i with long ē in most of Vulgar Latin, these two conjugations grew even closer together. Several of the most frequently-used forms became indistinguishable, while others became distinguished only by stress placement:

	Infinitive	1st	2nd	3rd	1st	2nd	3rd	Imperative singular
	Infinitive	singular			plural			Imperative singular
Second conjugation (Classical)	-ēre	-eō	-ēs	-et	-ēmus	-ētis	-ent	-ē
Second conjugation (Vulgar)	*-ẹ́re	*-(j)o	*-es	*-e(t)	*-ẹ́mos	*-ẹ́tes	*-en(t)	*-e
Third conjugation (Classical)	-ere	-ō	-is	-it	-imus	-itis	-unt	-e
Third conjugation (Vulgar)	*-ere	*-o	*-es	*-e(t)	*-emos	*-etes	*-on(t)	*-e

These two conjugations came to be conflated in many of the Romance languages, often by merging them into a single class while taking endings from each of the original two conjugations. Which endings survived was different for each language, although most tended to favour second conjugation endings over the third conjugation. Spanish, for example, mostly eliminated the third conjugation forms in favour of the second conjugation forms.

French and Catalan did the same, but tended to generalise the third conjugation infinitive instead. Catalan in particular almost eliminated the second conjugation ending over time, reducing it to a small relic class. In Italian, the two infinitive endings remained separate (but spelled identically), while the conjugations merged in most other respects much as in the other languages. However, the third-conjugation third-person plural present ending survived in favour of the second conjugation version, and was even extended to the fourth conjugation. Romanian also maintained the distinction between the second and third conjugation endings.

In the perfect, many languages generalized the -aui ending most frequently found in the first conjugation. This led to an unusual development; phonetically, the ending was treated as the diphthong /au/ rather than containing a semivowel /awi/, and in other cases the /w/ sound was simply dropped. We know this because it did not participate in the sound shift from /w/ to /β̞/. Thus Latin amaui, amauit ("I loved; he/she loved") in many areas became proto-Romance *amai and *amaut, yielding for example Portuguese amei, amou. This suggests that in the spoken language, these changes in conjugation preceded the loss of /w/.

Another major systemic change was to the future tense, remodelled in Vulgar Latin with auxiliary verbs. A new future was originally formed with the auxiliary verb habere, *amare habeo, literally "to love I have" (cf. English "I have to love", which has shades of a future meaning). This was contracted into a new future suffix in Western Romance forms, which can be seen in the following modern examples of "I will love":

- French: j'aimerai (je + aimer + ai) ← aimer ["to love"] + ai ["I have"].
- Portuguese and Galician: amarei (amar + [h]ei) ← amar ["to love"] + hei ["I have"]
- Spanish and Catalan: amaré (amar + [h]e) ← amar ["to love"] + he ["I have"].
- Italian: amerò (amar + [h]o) ← amare ["to love"] + ho ["I have"].

The first historical attestation of this new future can be found in a 7th-century Latin text, the Chronicle of Fredegar

A periphrastic construction of the form 'to have to' (late Latin habere ad) used as future is characteristic of Sardinian:

- Ap'a istàre < apo a istàre 'I will stay'
- Ap'a nàrrere < apo a nàrrer 'I will say'

An innovative conditional (distinct from the subjunctive) also developed in the same way (infinitive + conjugated form of habere). The fact that the future and conditional endings were originally independent words is still evident in literary Portuguese, which in these tenses allows clitic object pronouns to be incorporated between the root of the verb and its ending: "I will love" (eu) amarei, but "I will love you" amar-te-ei, from amar + te ["you"] + (eu) hei = amar + te + [h]ei = amar-te-ei.

In Spanish, Italian, Romanian and Portuguese, personal pronouns can still be omitted from verb phrases as in Latin, as the endings are still distinct enough to convey that information: venio > Sp vengo ("I come"). In French, however, all the endings are typically homophonous except the first and second person (and occasionally also third person) plural, so the pronouns are always used (je viens) except in the imperative.

Contrary to the millennia-long continuity of much of the active verb system, which has now survived 6000 years of known evolution, the synthetic passive voice was utterly lost in Romance, being replaced with periphrastic verb forms—composed of the verb "to be" plus a passive participle—or impersonal reflexive forms—composed of a verb and a passivizing pronoun.

Apart from the grammatical and phonetic developments there were many cases of verbs merging as complex subtleties in Latin were reduced to simplified verbs in Romance. A classic example of this are the verbs expressing the concept "to go". Consider three particular verbs in Classical Latin expressing concepts of "going": ire, vadere, and *ambitare. In Spanish and Portuguese ire and vadere merged into the verb ir, which derives some conjugated forms from ire and some from vadere. andar was maintained as a separate verb derived from ambitare.

Italian instead merged vadere and ambitare into the verb andare. At the extreme French merged three Latin verbs with, for example, the present tense deriving from vadere and another verb ambulare (or something like it) and the future tense deriving from ire. Similarly the Romance distinction between the Romance verbs for "to be", essere and stare, was lost in French as these merged into the verb être. In Italian, the verb essere inherited both Romance meanings of "being essentially" and "being temporarily of the quality of", while stare specialized into a verb denoting location or dwelling, or state of health.

==== Copula ====
The copula (that is, the verb signifying "to be") of Classical Latin was esse. This evolved to *essere in Vulgar Latin by attaching the common infinitive suffix -re to the classical infinitive; this produced Italian essere and French être through Proto-Gallo-Romance *essre and Old French estre as well as Spanish and Portuguese ser (Romanian a fi derives from fieri, which means "to become").

In Vulgar Latin a second copula developed utilizing the verb stare, which originally meant (and is cognate with) "to stand", to denote a more temporary meaning. That is, *essere signified the essence, while stare signified the state. Stare evolved to Spanish and Portuguese estar and Old French ester (both through *estare), Romanian "a sta" ("to stand"), using the original form for the noun ("stare"="state"/"starea"="the state"), while Italian retained the original form.

The semantic shift that underlies this evolution is more or less as follows: A speaker of Classical Latin might have said: vir est in foro, meaning "the man is in/at the marketplace". The same sentence in Vulgar Latin could have been *(h)omo stat in foro, "the man stands in/at the marketplace", replacing the est (from esse) with stat (from stare), because "standing" was what was perceived as what the man was actually doing.

The use of stare in this case was still semantically transparent assuming that it meant "to stand", but soon the shift from esse to stare became more widespread. In the Iberian peninsula esse ended up only denoting natural qualities that would not change, while stare was applied to transient qualities and location. In Italian, stare is used mainly for location, transitory state of health (sta male 's/he is ill' but è gracile 's/he is puny') and, as in Spanish, for the eminently transient quality implied in a verb's progressive form, such as sto scrivendo to express 'I am writing'.

The historical development of the stare + ablative gerund progressive tense in those Romance languages that have it seems to have been a passage from a usage such as sto pensando 'I stand/stay (here) in thinking', in which the stare form carries the full semantic load of 'stand, stay' to grammaticalization of the construction as expression of progressive aspect (Similar in concept to the Early Modern English construction of "I am a-thinking"). The process of reanalysis that took place over time bleached the semantics of stare so that when used in combination with the gerund the form became solely a grammatical marker of subject and tense (e.g. sto = subject first person singular, present; stavo = subject first person singular, past), no longer a lexical verb with the semantics of 'stand' (not unlike the auxiliary in compound tenses that once meant 'have, possess', but is now semantically empty: j'ai écrit, ho scritto, he escrito, etc.). Whereas sto scappando would once have been semantically strange at best (?'I stay escaping'), once grammaticalization was achieved, collocation with a verb of inherent mobility was no longer contradictory, and sto scappando could and did become the normal way to express 'I am escaping'. (Although it might be objected that in sentences like Spanish la catedral está en la ciudad, "the cathedral is in the city" this is also unlikely to change, but all locations are expressed through estar in Spanish, as this usage originally conveyed the sense of "the cathedral stands in the city").

=== Word order typology ===
Classical Latin in most cases adopted an SOV word order in ordinary prose, although other word orders were employed, such as in poetry, euphony, focus, or emphasis, enabled by inflectional marking of the grammatical function of words. However, word order in most of the modern Romance languages generally adopted a standard SVO word order. Relics of SOV word order still survive in the placement of clitic object pronouns (e.g. Spanish yo te amo 'I love you').

== Vocabulary ==
=== Lexical turnover ===
Over the centuries, spoken Latin lost certain words in favour of coinages; in favour of borrowings from neighbouring languages such as Gaulish, Germanic, or Greek; or in favour of other Latin words that had undergone semantic shift. The "lost" words often continued to enjoy some currency in literary Latin, however.

A commonly-cited example is the replacement of the highly irregular (suppletive) verb ferre, meaning 'to carry', with the entirely regular portare. Similarly, the verb loqui, meaning 'to speak', was replaced by a variety of alternatives such as the native fabulari and narrare or the Greek borrowing parabolare.

Classical Latin particles fared poorly, with all of the following vanishing in the course of its development to Romance: an, at, autem, donec, enim, etiam, haud, igitur, ita, nam, postquam, quidem, quin, quoad, quoque, sed, sive, utrum, vel.

=== Semantic drift ===
Many words experienced a shift in meaning. Some notable cases are civitas ('citizenry' → 'city', replacing urbs); focus ('hearth' → 'fire', replacing ignis); manducare ('chew' → 'eat', replacing edere); causa ('subject matter' → 'thing', competing with res); mittere ('send' → 'put', competing with ponere); necare ('murder' → 'drown', competing with submergere); pacare ('placate' → 'pay', competing with solvere), and totus ('whole' → 'all, every', competing with omnis).

== See also ==
=== Transition from Latin to Romance languages ===
- Palatalization in the Romance languages
- Phonological changes from Classical Latin to Proto-Romance
- Proto-Romance language
- Common Romanian, reconstructed proto-language
  - Daco-Roman culture (not language)
  - Thraco-Roman culture (not language)
- Romance copula
- Dialects of Latin

=== Texts ===
- Reichenau Glosses, 8th century
- Oaths of Strasbourg, 9th century
- Veronese Riddle, 8th/9th century
- Glosas Emilianenses, 10th/11th century

=== Romance languages ===
- Romance languages
  - Gallo-Italic languages
  - Gallo-Romance languages
  - Iberian Romance languages
    - Catalan phonology

=== History of specific Romance languages ===
- History of French
  - Old French
- History of Italian
- History of Portuguese
- History of Romanian
- History of Sicilian
- History of Spanish

=== Other ===
- Vulgate, 4th-century Latin translation of the Bible
- British Latin
- Pannonian Latin
- African Latin
