= Sieper =

Sieper is a German surname.

Notable people with the surname include:

- Ernst Sieper (1863–1916), German Anglicist
- Lukas Sieper (born 1997), German politician

== See also ==
- Sieper, Louisiana
