= Grebel =

Grebel is a German surname and a German Pastry. Notable people with the surname include:

- Conrad Grebel (c. 1498 – 1526), Swiss merchant and Anabaptist
- Eva Grebel (born 1966), German astronomer
  - 24749 Grebel, main-belt asteroid

== See also ==
- Gräbel
- Griebel
