= Lectionary 154 =

Lectionary ℓ 154
- New Testament manuscript
- Text: Evangelistarion
- Date: 13th century
- Script: Greek
- Now at: Bavarian State Library
- Size: 31.8 cm by 25 cm
- Hand: fine

Lectionary 154, designated by siglum ℓ 154 (in the Gregory-Aland numbering) is a Greek manuscript of the New Testament, on parchment leaves. Palaeographically it has been assigned to the 13th century.

== Description ==
The codex contains Lessons from the season of Lent to the month of December in the menology lectionary with large and numerous lacunae. The text is written in Greek minuscule letters, on 49 parchment leaves (31.8 cm by 25 cm), in two columns per page, 21 lines per page. The leaves are in disorder. It is written, in very small and neat cursive letters.

== History ==
Formerly the manuscript was held in Mannheim. The manuscript was examined by Gregory.

The manuscript is not cited in the critical editions of the Greek New Testament (UBS3).

Currently the codex is located in the Bavarian State Library (Gr. 326).

== See also ==
- List of New Testament lectionaries
- Biblical manuscript
- Textual criticism
