= Griebel =

Griebel is a German surname. Notable people with the surname include:

- George Henry Griebel
- Harald Griebel
- John H. Griebel
- Michael Griebel
- Oz Griebel
- Rolf Griebel
- Sophia Griebel

== See also ==
- Tekla Griebel-Wandall
