= Lorenz Franz Kielhorn =

German Indologist

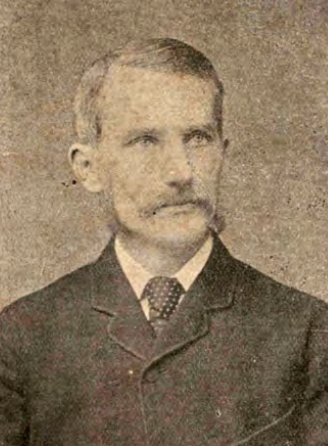

Lorenz Franz Kielhorn (31 May 1840 – 19 March 1908) was a German Indologist.

== Biography ==
Lorenz Franz Kielhorn was born and raised in Osnabrück, Germany. He studied under Theodor Benfey at the University of Göttingen, where he became member of Burschenschaft Hannovera (fraternity), and under Adolf Friedrich Stenzler at Breslau and with Albrecht Weber in Berlin. In 1862-65 he worked in Oxford, where he assisted Monier Williams in the production of a Sanskrit dictionary. While here, he also consulted with Friedrich Max Müller, when the latter was working on his first edition of Rigveda. From 1866 to 1881 he was a professor of Sanskrit at Deccan College in Pune, and after 1882, a professor at the University of Göttingen.

Kielhorn's results from the handling of rich material that he himself partially collected and partially got sent are mainly explained in Indian antiquary and Epigraphia Indica. After the death of Georg Bühler (1837-1898), he edited the "Grundriss der indoarischen Philologie". Together with Bühler, Kielhorn had initiated the series Bombay Sanskrit Series.

In 1887, Kielhorn was appointed an honorary Companion of the Order of the Indian Empire (CIE) for his services in Pune. He received the honorary degree Doctor of Laws (LL.D.) from the University of Glasgow in June 1901, and the honorary degree Doctor of Letters (D.Litt.) from the University of Oxford in June 1902.

In 1908, Kiehorn died in Osnabrück, Germany.

== Works ==
- Çāntanava's Phitsūtra (with translation in Abhandlungen für die Kunde des Morgenlandes, IV, 1866)
- Nāgojibhatta's Paribhāşenduçekhara (translated in Bombay Sanskrit series 1868)
- Sanskrit grammar (1870, translated into German by Wilhelm Solf in 1888).
- Kātyāyana and Patanjali (1876)
- The Vyākarana-mahābhāşya of Patanjali (3 volumes in Bombay Sanskrit series, 1880–85)
- Report on the search of Sanskrit manuscripts (1881)
- A grammar of the Sanskrit language (1888).
