= Adolf Friedrich Stenzler =

German Indologist

- Born: 9 July 1807; Wolgast
- Died: 27 February 1887 (aged 79)
- Citizenship: German
- Occupation: Indologist

Adolf Friedrich Stenzler (July 9, 1807 – February 27, 1887) was a German Indologist born in Wolgast.

He initially studied theology and Oriental languages at the University of Greifswald under Johann Gottfried Ludwig Kosegarten (1792–1860), then furthered his education at the University of Berlin with Franz Bopp (1791–1861) and at the University of Bonn under August Wilhelm Schlegel (1767–1845). In 1829 he earned his doctorate, then continued his studies in Paris, where he attended lectures by Antoine-Léonard de Chézy (1773–1832) and Silvestre de Sacy (1758–1838). Afterwards, he worked in the library of the British East India Company in London.

In 1833 he was appointed associate professor of Oriental languages at the University of Breslau, where in 1847 he became a full professor. At Breslau he was an instructor of Arabic and Persian, later giving classes on Sanskrit and comparative linguistics. From 1836 onward, he worked as curator of the university library. His students at Breslau included Lucian Scherman (1864–1946), Franz Kielhorn (1840–1908), Richard Pischel (1849–1908) and Thomas Rhys Davids (1843–1922).

Stenzler was a pioneer of Sanskrit studies in Germany. He published the Latin translations of two of Kalidasa's most famous poems - Raghuvamsa and Kumarasambhava. In 1868 he published his best written work, a highly regarded textbook on Sanskrit grammar and vocabulary, titled Elementarbuch der Sanskrit-Sprache. He made significant contributions in his research of Indian literature in regards to law and medicine.

In 1866 he became a corresponding member in the Royal Prussian Academy of Sciences.
