= Johann Georg von Werdenstein =

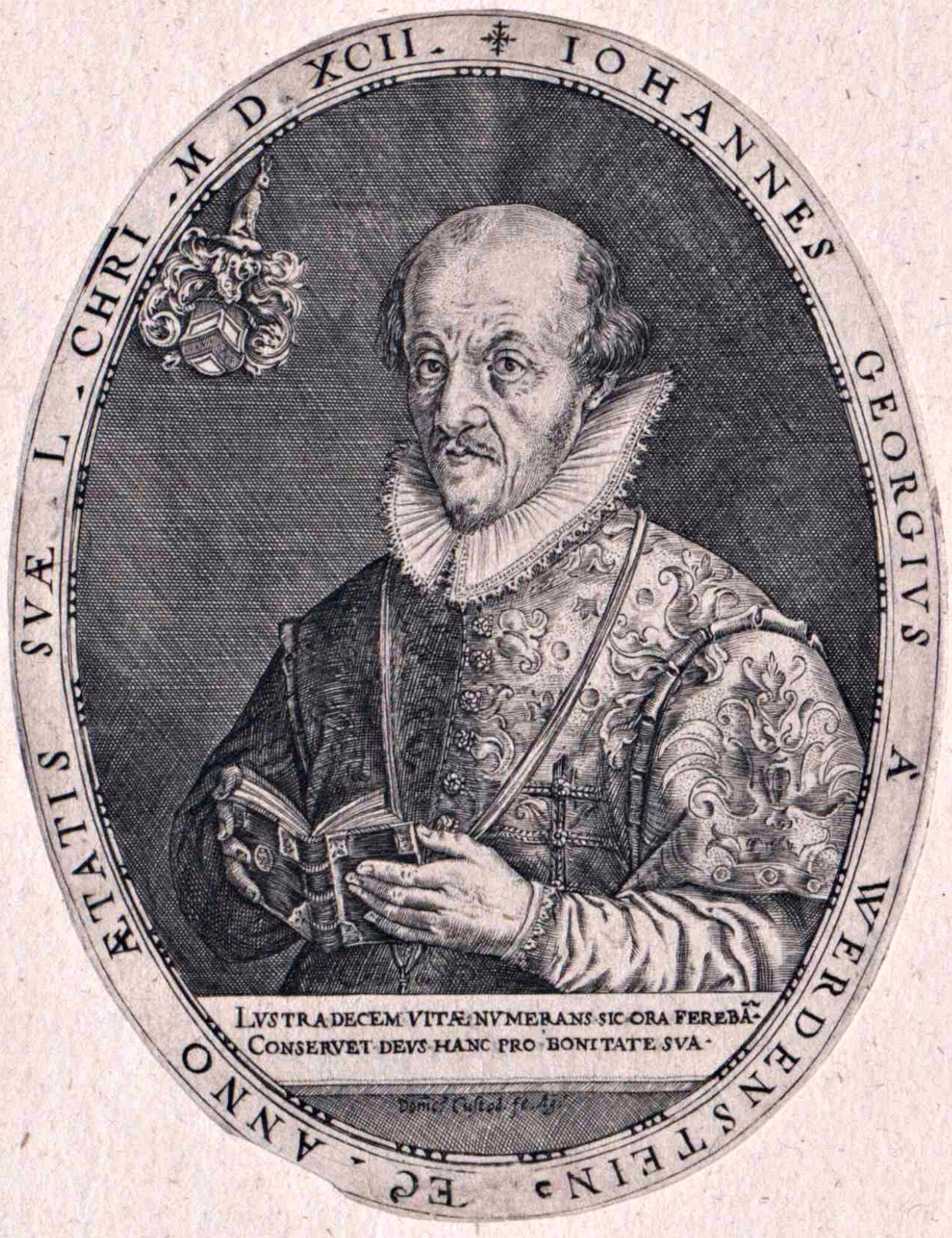
Johann Georg von Werdenstein

Johann Georg von Werdenstein (1542–1608), canon of Augsburg and Eichstätt, was the owner of a very substantial library consisting of tens of thousands of books.

Werdenstein came from an aristocratic family and entered the Catholic Church, becoming a canon of Augsburg Cathedral in 1563, and adding a further canonry at Eichstatt in 1567.

Around 9,000 volumes from his library including many musical items were purchased in 1592 for 6,000 florins by William V, Duke of Bavaria, for the Ducal Library in Munich, now the Bavarian State Library.
