= Rudolf Buttmann =

German lawyer, Nazi politician and library director

Director General Bavarian State Library
- In office 1 October 1935 – 8 May 1945
- Preceded by: Georg Reismüller
- Succeeded by: Gustav Hofmann

Ministerial Director Department for Cultural Policy Reich Ministry of the Interior
- In office 5 May 1933 – 1 October 1935

Personal details
- Born: 4 July 1885 Marktbreit, Kingdom of Bavaria, German Empire
- Died: 25 January 1947 (aged 61) Stockdorf, Bavaria, Allied-occupied Germany
- Party: Nazi Party
- Other political affiliations: National Liberal Party; German National People's Party; Völkische Block
- Education: Ludwig-Maximilians-Universität München
- Profession: Lawyer

Military service
- Allegiance: German Empire
- Years of service: 1914–1918
- Rank: Leutnant
- Unit: 12th Royal Bavarian Infantry Regiment; 18th Royal Bavarian Reserve Infantry Regiment
- Battles/wars: World War I
- Awards: Iron Cross, 2nd class

Rudolf Hermann Buttmann (4 July 1885 – 25 January 1947) was a German lawyer and politician who was Ministerial Director of the Department for Cultural Policy from 1933 to 1935, and a member of the Nazi Party. He was Director of the Bavarian State Library from 1935 to 1945.

== Early life ==
Buttmann was born in Marktbreit, the son of a school teacher. After attending gymnasium in Zweibrücken, he studied law and political science at the Ludwig-Maximilians-Universität München, the University of Freiburg, and the Friedrich Wilhelm University of Berlin, which he completed in 1907 by passing his state law examination. A year later he began an internship at the Royal Bavarian Court Library in Munich. In 1910, he received his doctorate in political science from the Ludwig-Maximilians-Universität München and, on 1 October of that year, he began working at the Bavarian State Parliament Library.

From 1914 to 1918, he took part in the First World War with the 12th Royal Bavarian Infantry Regiment and the 18th Royal Bavarian Reserve Infantry. He attained the rank of Leutnant and received the Iron Cross, second class. Buttmann was married to Karoline Schandl in 1916, with whom he had three sons. After the end of the war in 1918, Buttmann unsuccessfully attempted to organize bourgeois and right wing elements to form a citizen militia in opposition to left wing revolutionaries in the newly proclaimed Free State of Bavaria. He also supported the Freikorps Epp against the short-lived Bavarian Soviet Republic, and then returned to his position with the Bavarian State Parliament Library, where he was promoted to senior librarian in 1924.

During the time of the German Empire Buttmann had been a member of the National Liberal Party. After the November Revolution, he co-founded the German National People's Party (DNVP) in 1919. At this time he also became a member of the Deutschvölkischer Schutz- und Trutzbund, the largest and most influential antisemitic organization in Germany. Leaving the DNVP in 1922, he founded the Völkischen Rechtsblocks. Drawn to the nationalist and antisemitic platform of Adolf Hitler's Nazi Party, Buttmann took part in the failed Beer Hall Putsch on 9 November 1923. After the Nazi Party was outlawed, Buttmann on 6 January 1924 co-founded the Völkische Block, a Nazi front organization. Under its banner, Buttmann was elected as one of its 23 deputies to the Bavarian Landtag in May 1924. However, when Hitler reestablished the Nazi Party on 27 February 1925, Buttmann immediately joined the NSDAP (membership number 4).

== Nazi Party career ==
In September 1925, the NSDAP formed its own parliamentary bloc in the Bavarian Landtag; Buttmann was named its leader and would remain so until 1933. Over the next few years he was very active as a propaganda speaker throughout Bavaria, and was named a Reichsredner, or national speaker. During a debate in the Landtag in July 1927 concerning a drop in Bavarian tourism, Buttmann ascribed it not to antisemitic agitation, but to the presence of Jews in the Alpine spa of Bad Reichenhall, along with other non-German influences such as jazz music, which he denounced using vulgar, racist terms.

In September 1932, Buttmann became the head of the Main Department (Hauptabteilung) for Popular Education in the Nazi Party's Reichsleitung (National Leadership). After the Nazi seizure of power, Buttmann was considered by many to be a natural candidate to become the Education Minister in Bavaria but the post instead went to Hans Schemm, the powerful Gauleiter of the Bavarian East March. In October 1933, Buttmann was one of the founding members of Hans Frank's Academy for German Law. In November 1933, Buttmann was elected to the Reichstag from electoral constituency 24, Upper Bavaria-Swabia where he would continue to serve until 1945. From 1933 to 1945 he also served as Chairman of the German Language Association.

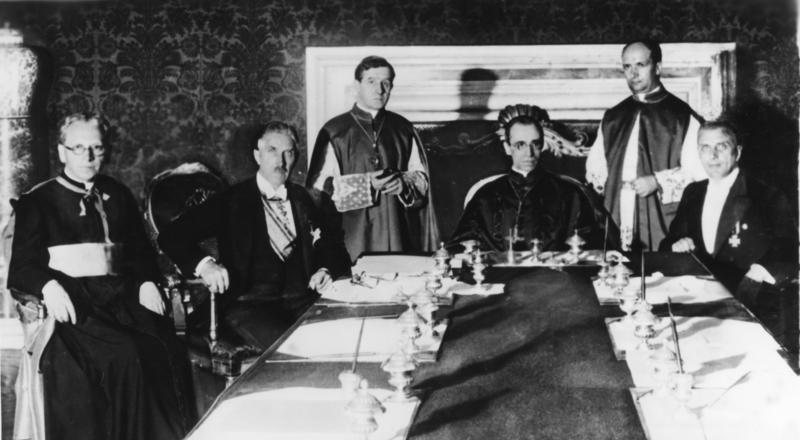
The signing of the Reichskonkordat on 20 July 1933 in Rome. From left to right: German prelate and politician Ludwig Kaas, German Vice-Chancellor Franz von Papen, Papal Secretary of Extraordinary Ecclesiastical Affairs Giuseppe Pizzardo, Papal Secretary of State Eugenio Cardinal Pacelli, Alfredo Ottaviani, and Rudolf Buttmann.

In 1933 and 1934 he published and edited the journal Völkische Kultur. From 5 May 1933 until 1 October 1935 he served as head of the Department for Cultural Policy in the Reich Ministry of the Interior with the rank of Ministerial Director. In this capacity, he served as a chief negotiator between the Reich and the Holy See over the July 1933 Reichskonkordat. He would continue to negotiate the implementing details of the pact over the next two years. He then left the Interior Ministry to become Director General of the Bavarian State Library, a post which he held from 1 October 1935 to the fall of the Nazi regime in May 1945. From 1936 he worked together with the Reich Institute for the History of the New Germany, and was a member of its advisory board on the "Jewish Question Research Department."

== Postwar events ==
At the end of the war, Buttmann was briefly interned on 19 May 1945, and died on 25 January 1947 at his home in Stockdorf, near Munich. On 26 November 1948, he was posthumously classified by the denazification tribunal in Starnberg as belonging to Group I ("main offender"); on appellate review, he was reclassified as Group III ("lesser offender") on 21 March 1949.

== Sources ==
- Klee, Ernst (2007). Das Personenlexikon zum Dritten Reich. Wer war was vor und nach 1945. Frankfurt-am-Main: Fischer-Taschenbuch-Verlag. ISBN 978-3-596-16048-8.
- Pridham, Geoffrey (1973). Hitler's Rise to Power: The Nazi Movement in Bavaria, 1923-1933. New York: Harper & Row. ISBN 978-0-061-36116-6.

== External weblinks ==
- Director General Rudolf Buttmann in the Bavarian State Library Collections
- Rudolf Buttmann in the Bavarian Culture and Knowledge website
- Information about Rudolf Buttmann in the Reichstag database
