= Rolf Griebel =

Rolf Griebel (born September 15, 1949) is a German librarian, library administrator, and prominent figure in German and international library associations. He was the Director General of the Bavarian State Library (Bayerische Staatsbibliothek or BSB) from 2004 to 2014.

Griebel is the BSB's Partner Representative in OCLC (Online Computer Library Center), which is a nonprofit, membership, computer library service and research organization dedicated to the public purposes of furthering access to the world's information and reducing information costs. OCLC and its member libraries cooperatively produce and maintain WorldCat—the OCLC Online Union Catalog.

Griebel was ultimately responsible for BSB's participation in the Google Books Library Project, which involves a series of agreements between Google and major international libraries through which a collection of its public domain books will be scanned in their entirety and made available for free to the public online.

== Published work ==
- Griebel, Rolf. (2002). Etatbedarf universitärer Bibliothekssysteme. Ein Modell zur Sicherung der Literatur- und Informationsversorgung an den Universitäten. Frankfurt-am-Main: Kostermans. ISBN 978-3-465-03227-4 (cloth)
- Griebel, Rolf, Andreas Werner, and Sigrid Hornei. (1994). Bestandsaufbau und Erwerbungspolitik in universitären Bibliothekssystemen. Versuch einer Standortbestimmung. Berlin: Deutsches Bibliotheksinst. ISBN 3-87068-934-X (cloth)
- Dörpinghaus, Hermann Josef and Rolf Griebel. (1992). Checkliste für die Auswahl von Lieferanten ausländischer Monographien. Berlin: Deutsches Bibliotheksinstitut. ISBN 3-87068-418-6 (cloth)

== See also ==
- National libraries
