= Mulomedicina Chironis =

The Mulomedicina Chironis (literally, "Chiron's Medicine for Mules") is a 4th-century medical treatise on medicine for treating horses, written in Latin.

== Author ==
The name of the author is stated to be a certain Chiron Centaurus, which was certainly not the author's real name, but was likely a witty pseudonym.

== Sources ==
The Mulomedicina Chironis lists several sources: Apsyrtus, Cato the Elder, Columella, Gargilius Martialis, and also some anonymous and lost writings. The book is not a translation of the Greek veterinary texts, the so-called Hippiatrica, although there's no denying the texts are useful to understand the Mulomedicina.

== As a Model for Other Works ==
The Mulomedicina Chironis is the main source for Vegetius' Mulomedicina. The same Vegetius says at one point (Mul. 1, prologue 3–4): Chiron vero et Apsyrtus diligentius cuncta rimati eloquentiae inopia ac sermonis ipsius vilitate sordescunt. ("In spite of their care, Chiron and Apsyrtus don't sound good due to their poor expression and style error.")

== Manuscripts ==
There remain two manuscripts containing the Mulomedicina Chironis. The first manuscript, the 15th century CLM 243, was found in 1885 at the Bavarian State Library in Munich by Wilhelm Meyer. The second manuscript, D III 34, dating from 1495, was discovered in 1988 at Basel University Library by Werner Sackmann.

== Bibliography ==
- Klaus-Dietrich Fischer. "§513 The so called 'Mulomedicina Chironis' ". In: Reinhard Herzog, Peter Leberecht Shmidt (eds.): Handbook of the Latin Literature of Antiquity. Vol. 5.: Restoration and Renovation 284-374 AD 1989. Munich: Beck. ISBN 3406318630. pp. 77–80. Updated French translation in: Nouvelle histoire de la littérature latine. Vol. 5: Restauration et renouveau. La littérature latine de 284 à 374 après J.-C. 1995. Paris. pp. 87–90.
