= Bavarian State Library =

State library in Bavaria, Germany

Coordinates: 48°08′50″N 11°34′50″E

- Bayerische Staatsbibliothek

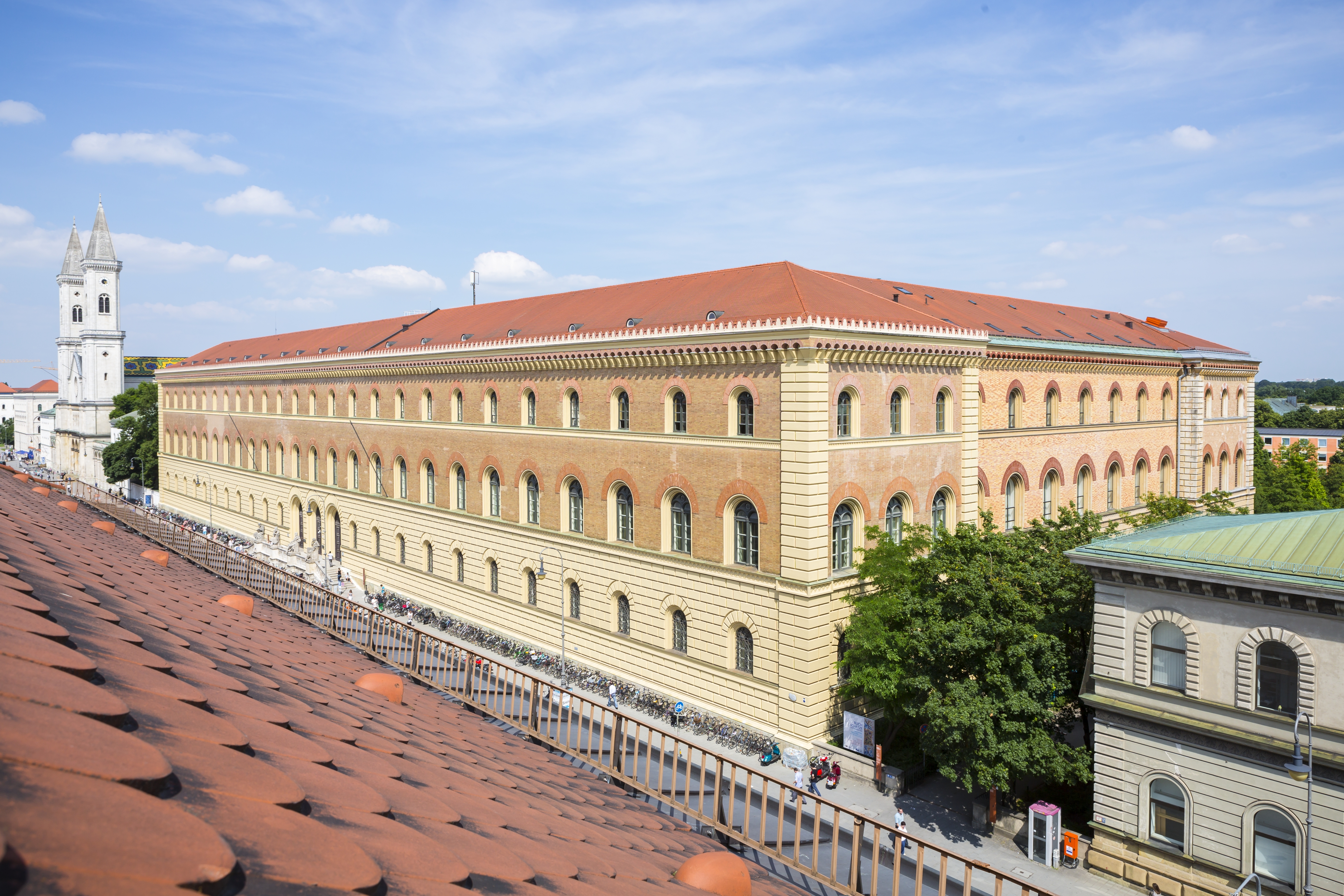
- The Bayerische Staatsbibliothek, Munich
- Location: Munich, Bavaria, Germany
- Type: Academic library, regional library
- Established: 1558; 468 years ago

Collection
- Items collected: 33,921,166
- Size: 10,629,764 (2017)
- Legal deposit: yes, since 1663

Other information
- Director: Klaus Ceynowa
- Website: www.bsb-muenchen.de

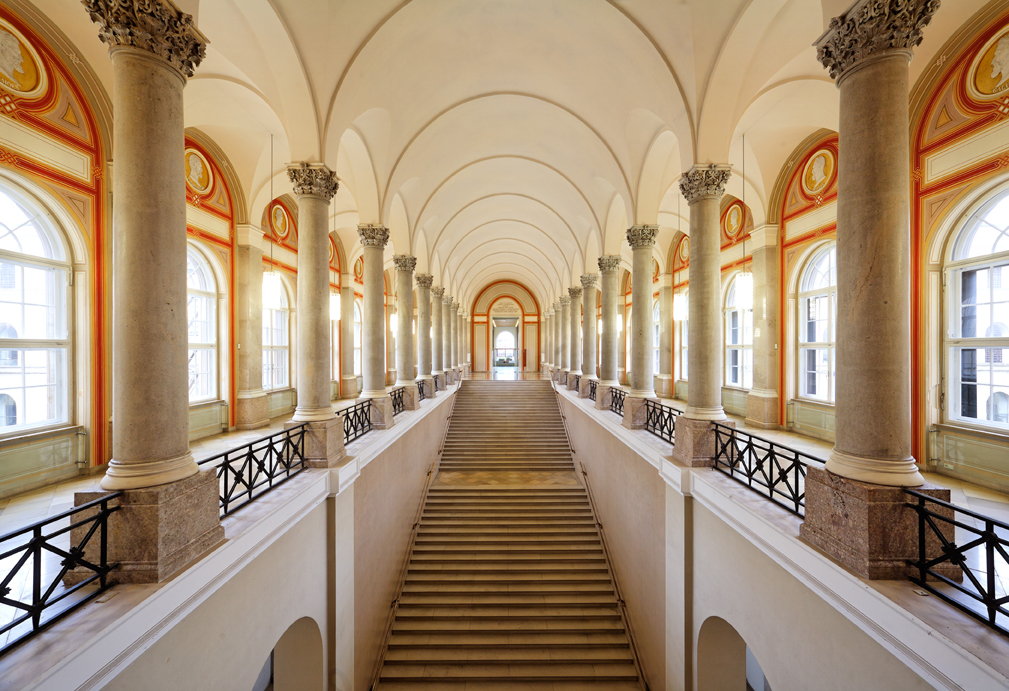
Splendid stairway of the Bayerische Staatsbibliothek

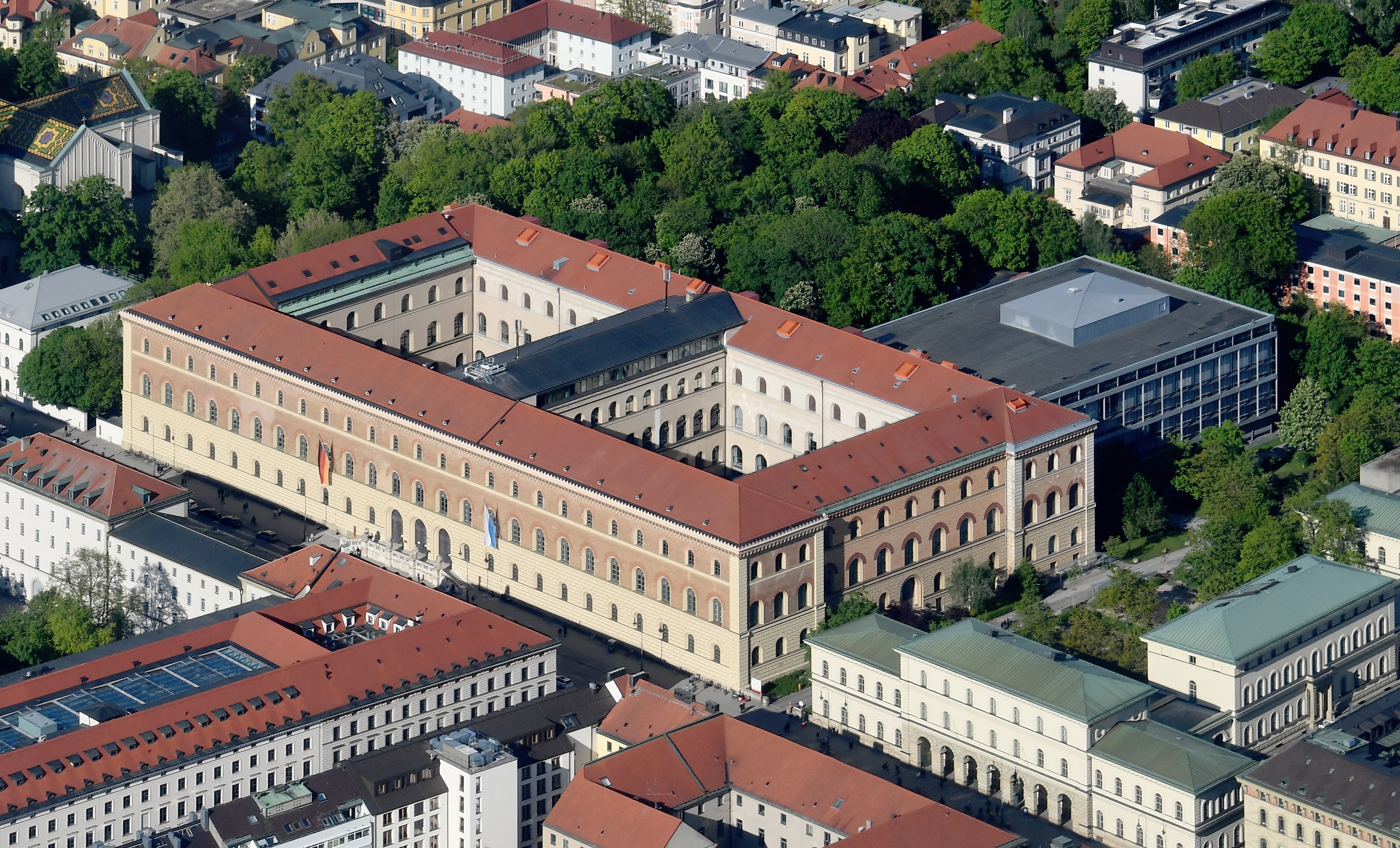
Aerial view of the Bayerische Staatsbibliothek

The Bavarian State Library (German: Bayerische Staatsbibliothek, abbreviated BSB, called Bibliotheca Regia Monacensis before 1919) in Munich is the central "Landesbibliothek", i. e. the state library of the Free State of Bavaria, the biggest universal and research library in Germany and one of Europe's most important universal libraries. With its collections currently comprising around 39.4 million media units (as of 2025), it ranks among the leading research libraries worldwide. The Bayerische Staatsbibliothek furthermore is Europe's second-largest journals library (after the British Library). Furthermore, its historical holdings encompass one of the most important manuscript collections of the world, the largest collection of incunabula worldwide, as well as numerous further important special collections. Its collection of historical prints before 1850 totals almost one million units.

The legal deposit law, still applicable today, has been in force since 1663 and requires that two copies of every printed work published in Bavaria have to be submitted to the Bayerische Staatsbibliothek. The BSB publishes the specialist journal Bibliotheksforum Bayern and has been publishing the Bibliotheksmagazin together with the Berlin State Library between 2007 and 2023. Its building is situated in the Ludwigstrasse.

== Tasks ==
- General and research library
- Central state and repository library of the Free State of Bavaria
- Collection of regional legal deposits and publications related to Bavaria
- Part of Germany's virtual national library in cooperation with the German National Library and the Berlin State Library
- Runs the Munich Digitization Center
- Responsibility for special subject collections of the German Research Foundation (Deutsche Forschungsgemeinschaft)
- Collaboration on the Corporate Body Authority File (Gemeinsame Körperschaftsdatei, GKD) and the Name Authority File (Personennamendatei, PND)

== Use ==
In 2019, the library counted 78,600 active users and 1,173,000 loans. Its reading rooms are used by around 4,000 readers every day. In the general reading room, open daily from 8 AM to 12 AM, approximately 111,000 volumes, primarily reference works, are freely accessible. Additionally, every day approximately 1,500 volumes are retrieved from the repositories and made available for use there. In the periodicals reading room around 18,000 topical issues of current periodicals are available. The departments of manuscripts and early printed books, maps and images, music, as well as Eastern Europe, Orient and East Asia have their own reading rooms with open-access collections. In 2010, a new research reading room was opened, focusing on Historical Sciences and Bavarian History and Culture (Aventinus Reading Room).

== Inventory ==
- c. 38.5 million media units (including e-media)
- c. 11.4 million books
- Old Books (1501-1800) 920.000 volumes (as of 2023).
  - 16th century books: 116.951 volumes.
  - 17th century books: 309.392 volumes.
  - 18th century books: 493.736 volumes.
- c. 148,000 manuscripts: the catalogue is the work of librarian Johann Andreas Schmeller (1785–1852).
- Latin (Codices latini monacenses – Clm), c. 17,000 items.
  - Mulomedicina Chironis (Clm 243), 4th century
  - Breviarium Alarici (Clm 22501), 6th century
  - Purple Evangeliary (Clm 23631), 9th century
  - Codex Aureus of St. Emmeram (Clm 14000), c. 870
  - Computistic ms. of St. Emmeram (Clm 14456), early 9th century
  - Prayerbook of Otto III, c. 1000 (Clm 30111)
  - Evangeliary of Otto III (Clm 4453), c. 1000
  - Pericopes of Henry II (Clm 4452)
  - Sacramentary of Henry II (Clm 4456)
  - Uta Codex (Clm 13601), c. 1025
  - Ruodlieb romance fragments (Clm 19486), c. 1050
  - Scheyerer Matutinalbuch (Clm 17401)
  - Carmina Burana (Clm 4660)
  - prayer book of Maximilian I of Bavaria (Clm 23640)
  - the "Munich Manual of Demonic Magic" (Clm 849)
- German (Codices germanici monacenses – Cgm), c. 10,500 items
  - Manuscript A of the Nibelungenlied (Cgm 34); which was inscribed on UNESCO's Memory of the World International Register in 2009
  - Freising manuscripts
  - Wessobrunn Prayer (Clm 22053)
  - Muspilli (Clm 14098)
  - Parzival by Wolfram von Eschenbach (Cgm 19)
  - Tristan by Gottfried von Strassburg (Cgm 51)
  - the Liber illuministarum (ca. 1500), one of the largest European arts and crafts recipe books (Cgm 821)
- Greek (Codices graeci – Cod.graec.), 645 items
- Slavic (Codices slavici, Cod.slav.), c. 100 items
  - the "Munich Serbian Psalter", after 1370
- Music manuscripts, c. 37,500 items
- Illustrated manuscripts (Codices iconographici), c. 550 items
  - Fechtbuch of Paulus Hector Mair (Cod. icon. 393)
  - choir books by Orlando di Lasso (Mus. ms. A I+II)
  - Illuminated manuscripts from the Ottonian period produced in the monastery of Reichenau (Lake Constance), which were inscribed on UNESCO's Memory of the World Register in 2003
- 54,000 current periodicals (print and electronic; Europe's second largest holding)
- 21,000 incunabula (the world's largest holding) of around 9,660 different incunabula, among them
  - a Gutenberg Bible
- c. 5 million digitized works

== Areas of emphasis ==
- History, general
- Pre-history and early history
- Byzantium
- Classical studies, incl. ancient history Medieval—and new Latin philology
- History of Germany, Austria and Switzerland
- History of France and Italy
- Romania
- Romanian language and literature
- Albanian language and literature
- Eastern-, eastern central and south-eastern Europe (in detail: Russia, Belarus, Ukraine, Moldova, Poland, the Czech Republic, Slovakia, Bulgaria, Slovenia, Croatia, Bosnia and Herzegovina, Serbia, Montenegro, Macedonia, Albania, Kosovo
- Modern-age Greece (including language and literature)
- Musicology
- Information science, book studies and library science

== Organisation ==
=== Directorate ===
Since 1 May 2025 Dorothea Sommer is director general of the Bavarian State Library. The head office, the assistant to the directors, the office of corporate counsel, the information technology department and the public relations department are also part of the directorate.

Directors general:

- 1882–1909 Georg von Laubmann
- 1909–1929 Hans Schnorr von Carolsfeld
- 1929–1935 Georg Reismüller
- 1935–1945 Rudolf Buttmann
- 1948–1966 Gustav Hofmann
- 1967–1972 Hans Striedl
- 1972–1992 Franz Georg Kaltwasser
- 1992–2004 Hermann Leskien
- 2004–2014 Rolf Griebel
- 2015–2025 Klaus Ceynowa
- 2025– Dorothea Sommer

=== Main departments ===
==== Central Administration ====
The central administration is in charge of general administrative management; moreover, it acts as a service provider for all areas of the library. The department is responsible for the areas "budget", "human resources" and "internal services, construction".

==== Collection Development and Cataloguing ====
This department acquires all types of media (in the form or by way of presents, purchase, licensing, deposit copies and swapping items), and catalogues and indexes them both formally and according to subject. The Munich Digitisation Centre is a section of the department. It handles the digitisation and online publication of the cultural heritage preserved by the Bavarian State Library and by other institutions. It provides one of the largest and fastest growing digital collections in Germany. The department is also responsible for conservation and collection care. This division protects the media published from the year 1850 onward against damage and decay. It secures their long-term availability.

==== User Services ====
The user services department acts as an agent of the collections and services of the library. The department consists of the divisions of document provision, document administration, document delivery and information- and reading-room services.

==== Manuscripts and Early Printed Books ====
The department of manuscripts and early printed books is responsible for the most valuable historical collections of the library. The worldwide renown of the Bayerische Staatsbibliothek is founded on this precious heritage. The department has a separate reading room that is specially equipped for working with old books.

=== Special Departments ===
==== Map Collection and Image Archive ====
This department administrates printed maps from the year 1500 up to the present, atlases, cartographic material and the image archive of the Bayerische Staatsbibliothek. The image archive also includes parts of the archives of Heinrich Hoffmann, Bernhard Johannes and Felicitas Timpe. The Map Collection and Image Archive also have – together with the department of music – their own reading room.

==== Department of Music ====
The Department of Music ranks among the world's leading music libraries, due to both the quantity and quality of its historical collections and its broad acquisition profile. Its beginnings date back to the 16th century. The area of collection emphasis "musicology" of the German Research Foundation is overseen by this department. A special reading room for music, maps and images is provided for the library users.

==== Oriental and East Asia Department ====
The oriental collections of the Bayerische Staatsbibliothek comprise 260,000 volumes in Arabic, Armenian, Georgian, Hebrew, Yiddish, Mongolian, Persian, Tibetan and Indian languages. The East-Asian collections comprise more than 310,000 volumes in the Chinese, Japanese, Korean, Thai and Vietnamese languages. Users can avail themselves of the open-access collections in the east reading room occupied together with the department of Eastern Europe.

==== Department of Eastern Europe (Osteuropaabteilung) ====
The department of Eastern Europe is the largest special department of the Bayerische Staatsbibliothek, holding around one million books about and from Eastern Europe, from early modern times up to the 21st century. In addition to the eastern European area, it also addresses eastern central and south-eastern Europe as well as the Asian part of Russia. The open-access collection of the department is accommodated in the library's east reading room.

=== Departments in Charge of Predominantly Regional-Level Tasks ===
The departments in charge of tasks predominantly allocated to a regional level are the Bayerische Bibliotheksschule (Bavarian School of Library and Information Science), the Landesfachstelle für das öffentliche Bibliothekswesen (Consulting Centre for Public Libraries) as well as the head office of the Bavarian Library Network (Bibliotheksverbund Bayern).

=== State-Funded Bavarian Regional Libraries ===
The Bavarian regional state-funded libraries form part of Bavaria's academic library system. They are subordinated to the Bayerische Staatsbibliothek in the organisation structure. Among these libraries are the state libraries of Amberg, Ansbach, Neuburg an der Donau, Passau and Regensburg, the Studienbibliothek Dillingen, the Landesbibliothek Coburg, the Bamberg State Library (German: Staatsbibliothek Bamberg) as well as the Hofbibliothek Aschaffenburg.

== History ==
The library was founded in 1558 as the court library of Duke Albrecht V, and was originally located in the vaulted chamber of the Alter Hof (old court) of the Munich residence. Initially, two book collections were acquired: on the one hand the personal papers of the Austrian jurist, orientalist and imperial chancellor Johann Albrecht Widmannstetter, consisting of oriental manuscripts and prints, editions of classic authors and works from the areas of theology, philosophy und jurisprudence, and on the other hand the collection of the Augsburg patrician Johann Jakob Fugger, which was acquired in 1571. Fugger had commissioned agents to collect volumes of manuscripts and printed works in Italy, Spain and the Netherlands. In the end the works collected in this way amounted to more than 10,000 volumes. At the same time, he had had manuscripts copied in Venice.

Apart from this, in 1552 Fugger had purchased the collection of manuscripts and incunabula of the physician and humanist Hartmann Schedel, representing one of the richest humanistic private libraries north of the Alps. The Fugger collection was first administrated and organised by the physician Samuel Quichelberg from Antwerp. He had adopted the shelving system of the Augsburg court library. Later the collection was administered by the librarian Wolfgang Prommer, who had catalogued the collection both alphabetically and according to keywords. Aegidius Oertel from Nuremberg became the first librarian in 1561. The main users of the library were the Jesuits, who had been invited to Munich in 1559.

William V continued the collection, making further purchases:

- Spanish prints from the personal papers of the Tyrolean knight Anselm Stöckel (1583)
- The collection of the Augsburg councillor Johann Heinrich Herwarth von Hohenberg comprising numerous music prints (1585)
- Humanistic library of the canon of Augsburg and Eichstätt Johann Georg von Werdenstein (1592)

In 1600 the collection comprised 17,000 volumes.

The secularization of Bavaria and the transfer of the court library of the Electorate of the Palatinate around the year 1803 added approximately 550,000 volumes and 18,600 manuscripts to the library's holdings.

In 1827 Friedrich von Gärtner was commissioned to plan a representative building for the court- and state library. The original plan was to erect the building at Ludwigstrasse 1. In 1828 the plot opposite the Glyptothek on Königsplatz was chosen as location, but later in the same year the planners switched back again to Ludwigstrasse. The blueprints were completed in 1831. For lack of funds the laying of the foundation stone had to be postponed to 8 July 1832. The construction work on the building planned by Gärtner was concluded in 1843.

In 1919 the library received the name that it still bears today: Bayerische Staatsbibliothek.

During the Second World War more than 500,000 volumes were lost, although the collections were partly evacuated from the building. Some of the books were for example stored in the palace chapel of Schloss Haimhausen. Of the building itself 85% was destroyed. The reconstruction of the library building and the reintegration of evacuated holdings started in 1946. The books were destroyed on two occasions; the first time 400,000 items were lost including 140,000 theses, and the second time 100,000 unspecified items. Of the books that have been lost (about 380,000), a third or 118,800 have been recovered or repurchased to the present (2020).

From 1953 to 1966 the professors Hans Döllgast und Sep Ruf had to plan and realize the reconstruction of the eastern wing, a new area behind historic walls, and the extension building of the Bavarian State Library, a glass-steel frame construction for the bibliotheca. They made an available surface of 17.000 m^{2} and a cubature of 84.000 m^{3}. 1967 a jury with Hans Scharoun gave the price of the BDA Bayern to the extension building. The inauguration of the restored south wing of the building in 1970 marked the conclusion of the reconstruction work on the building.

The Speicherbibliothek Garching (book repository) was inaugurated in 1988.

The Bayerische Staatsbibliothek has also initiated large-scale internet projects. In 1997 the Munich Digitization Center took up work and the BSB started developing its web portals, including its own web site. The card catalogue 1841–1952 and the catalogue of incunabula 1450–1500 were converted, thus making the complete holdings of printed materials of the Bayerische Staatsbibliothek available online. The service "Digitisation on Demand", offered by a network of several European libraries, makes millions of books published between 1500 and 1900 available in digital form.

On 7 March 2007 Director General Rolf Griebel announced that Google Book Search will take over the digitisation of the copyright-free holdings of the Bayerische Staatsbibliothek. In 2008, the year of its 450th anniversary, the Deutscher Bibliotheksverband (German Library Association) awarded the title of Bibliothek des Jahres (Library of the year) to the BSB.

In 2012 an Italian scholar discovered among Johann Jakob Fugger's manuscripts in the library an 11th-century Greek codex containing 29 ancient homilies, previously unpublished, by the theologian Origen of Alexandria.

== Restitution ==
Since 2003 the Bavarian State Library has gone to great efforts to restitute illegally-acquired library material. The most recent example is the restitution of the so-called Płock Pontifical to Poland in April 2015. It had been stolen by the Nazis from the Płock Bishopric in 1940 and was taken to Königsberg University. The Bavarian State Library bought the manuscript in 1973 for 6,200 DM at an auction in Munich. In the past years, the library has searched through those segments of its collections that are in question for illegitimate purchases. All in all, over 60,000 books have been meticulously checked so far. The library has identified around 500 books whose acquisition is to be regarded as unlawful. Subsequently, to these findings, several restitutions have taken place, amongst others the Bavarian State Library returned 78 volumes originating from Thomas Mann's research library to the Thomas Mann Archive in Zurich in 2007. Further restitutions are in preparation, for example 252 books from the former publishing house Geca Kon.

== See also ==
- State libraries of Germany
- German National Library
- Google Books Library Project
- Virtual Library of Musicology
- Books in Germany
