= Lucian Scherman =

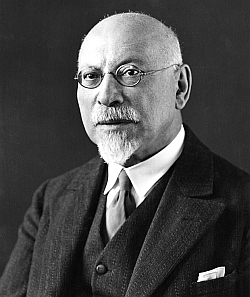
Lucian Scherman

Lucian Scherman (October 10, 1864, in Posen – May 29, 1946, in Hanson, Massachusetts) was a German Indologist, curator of the Ethnology Museum in Munich, and also a professor at the University there.

== Studies and academic work ==
Scherman was the son of merchants and landowners in Posen. After attending high school in Breslau and Posen, in 1882 he took up the study of Sanskrit at the University of Breslau with Adolf Friedrich Stenzler. In 1883, he relocated to Munich, where he continued his studies at the Ludwig-Maximilians-Universität München. Scherman received his doctorate in the summer of 1885. His dissertation was entitled Eine eingehende Erörterung der philosophischen Hymnen aus der Rig- und Atharva-Veda-Sanhitâ sowohl an sich als auch im Verhältnis zur Philosophie der älteren Upanishad's. The dissertation was, coincidentally, the answer to a prize question that his instructor, Ernst Kuhn, had put to the faculty. It was announced that Scherman would win the prize for his dissertation.

From October 1910 to December 1911, Scherman and his wife Christine undertook an extended research trip to British Ceylon, British Burma, and British India. Scherman's eminence both in Germany and abroad was so considerable that a special Department of Asian Ethnology with an emphasis on Indian Culture was created specifically for him.

== Works ==
Lucian Scherman has written many articles and books, and it would be difficult to draw up an exhaustive list. Here are some of them:

- Philosophische Hymnen aus der Rig- und Atharva-veda-Sanhitâ : verglichen mit den Philosophemen der älteren Upanishad's (Philosophical hymns from the Rig and Atharva Veda Sanhitâ : compared with the philosophemes of the older Upanishad's), (1877).
- Orientalische bibliographie (Oriental bibliography), (1896).
- Allgemeine Methodik der Volkskunde : Berichte über Erscheinungen in den Jahren (General methodology of folklore : reports on phenomena in the years), (1899) .
- Orientalische Bibliographie: Drei Hefte in einem Band (Oriental Bibliography: Three issues in one volume), (1904).
- Textiles, crafts and customs of Burma's women world (1910)
- Völkerkundliche notizen aus Oberbirma (Ethnological notes from Upper Burma), (1911).
- Brettchenwebereien aus Birma und den Himalayaländern (Board weavings from Burma and the Himalayan countries), (1913).
- Zur altchinesischen Plastik : Erläuterung einiger Neuzugänge im Münchener Ethnographischen Museum (On Ancient Chinese Sculpture : Explanation of Some New Additions to the Munich Ethnographic Museum), (1915).
- Frühbuddhistische Steinskulpturen in China (Early Buddhist stone sculptures in China), (1921).
- Das Museum für Völkerkunde : im Nordflügel der Hofgartenarkaden (The Museum of Ethnology : in the north wing of the Hofgarten Arcades), (1922).
- Im Stromgebiet des Irrawaddy : Birma und seine Frauenwelt (In the Irrawaddy River Basin : Burma and Its Womankind), (1922).
- Die ältesten Buddhadarstellungen des Münchener Museums für Völkerkunde (The oldest Buddha representations in the Munich Museum of Ethnology),(1928).
- Buddha im fürstenschmuck; erläuterung hinterindischer bildwerke des Münchener museums für völkerkunde (Buddha in princely ornaments; explanation of Hindustani pictorial works from the Munich Museum of Ethnology), (1932) .
