= Ernst Sieper =

German Anglicist

- Born: 30 August 1863; Durchsholz Lennep Remscheid
- Died: 6 January 1916 (aged 52); Munich
- Spouse: Luise Oldenbourg (m. 1904)

Ernst Sieper (30 August 1863 – 6 January 1916) was a German Anglicist.

- From 1890 to 1895, he was employed as elementary school teacher.
- From 1896 to 1898, he studied and researched in England.
- In summer semester 1898, he habilitated at the Ludwig-Maximilians-Universität München.
- In the winter semester 1904 to 1905, he became extraordinary Professor at the Ludwig-Maximilians-Universität München.

== Education ==
- From 1869 to 1878, he attended elementary school in Lennep, besides he received private lessons in realism, French and music.
- In 1870, he was student of the Preparatory Institute in Götterswickerhamm in Wesel.
- From autumn of 1880 to 1883, he was pupil at the teacher training college at Rheydt.
- After passing his first teacher exam, he taught until Easter 1889, most recently as a teacher at the higher daughter school in Solingen.
- In the fall of 1890, he passed his graduation exam at the Realgymnasium in Barmen and studied until the winter semester of 1894 to 1895 at the University of Bonn Germanic philology and its auxiliary sciences.
- In addition, he also heard lectures on philosophy, art history and geography.
- In the spring of 1894, he made a study trip to England.
- On 26 November 1894, he attended his Rigorosum at Heidelberg University and the University of Bonn.
- October 25, 1895 Doctor of Philosophy: Die Geschichte von Soliman und Perseda in der neueren Litteratur. Inaugural-Dissertation zur Erlangung der Doctorwürde der hohen philosophischen Fakultät der Universität Heidelberg

== Publications ==
- His most important contribution to science was his scholarly edition of John Lydgate's "Reason and Sensuality" (Early Engl. Text. Soc., Extra Ser. 84, 1901).
- He also edited "Les echecs amoureux," an old French allegory in the style of the "Roman de la Rose," and the source of Lydgate's poem (Weimar, 1898).

Soon, however, Professor Sieper's interest was directed towards the modern period of English literature, and he devoted himself to the study of the aesthetic movement in the Romantic and the Victorian age. The fruits of his researches in this never forsook the cause he had espoused. In numerous newspaper articles he pleaded for fair play and reacted against the vagaries of chauvinism. It was his sacred conviction that an ultimate adjustment of the conflicting political interests of England and Germany was possible, and that it ought to be prepared by intellectual and social cooperation. And no doubt, had Professor Sieper lived to see the conclusion of peace, his influence would have contributed in a large measure to Intellectual and social cooperation. And no doubt had Professor Sieper lived to see the conclusion of peace, his influence would have contributed to a large measure to quiet the chauvinists on both sides of the Channel, at least in the république des letrees.

- He died in Munich, Germany on January 6, 1916, as professor of English literature and philology at the Ludwig-Maximilians-Universität München.
- Die Geschichte von Soliman und Perseda in der neueren Litteratur 90
- Les Echecs Amoureux 98;

== Personal ==
He married Luise Oldenbourg, July 11, 1904, daughter of Hans Oldenbourg (1849–1922) granddaughter of Rudolf Oldenbourg editor Munich.
