= Bertrandon de la Broquière =

Burgundian travel writer (c. 1400 – 1459)

Bertrandon de la Broquière

Bertrandon giving a Latin translation of the Koran to Duke Philip of Burgundy (detail of Bertrandon de la Broquière). Illustration (folio 152v) by Jean Le Tavernier from BnF, MS fr. 9087, made in Lille in 1455.

Bertrandon de la Bro(c)quière (c. 1400 – 9 May 1459) was a Burgundian spy and pilgrim to the Middle East in 1432–33. The book of his travels, Le Voyage d'Outre-Mer, is a detailed and lively account of the political situations and practical customs of the various regions he visited. He wrote it in French at the request of Philip the Good, Duke of Burgundy, for the purpose of facilitating a new crusade.

== Life ==
Bertrandon was born late in the fourteenth century or early in the fifteenth in the Duchy of Aquitaine. His life before 1421 is unknown. In that year he was made an esquire (écuyer tranchant) by Philip the Good. He rapidly gained the confidence of the duke and was entrusted with a series of important missions. In 1423 he was honoured with the title premier écuyer tranchant, "first esquire".

From February 1432 to the middle of 1433 Bertrandon undertook his pilgrimage to the Mideast. Upon his return he was treated to more honours. In 1442 Philip arranged for Bertrandon to marry Catherine, daughter of Jean de Bernieulles, one of the richest heiresses of the Artois, and in 1443 he granted Bertrandon the captaincy of the castle of Rupelmonde on the left bank of the Escaut, a strategic fortress. In 1452 Bertrandon was present with Philip at the Battle of Gavere against the rebels of Ghent. In July 1453 he was among the elite lords present in the ducal tent when the conditions of peace were imposed on Ghent.

The last mention of Bertrandon in contemporary records dates from 1455, when Philip coaxed him to compose some memoirs of his expedition to the east. A finished copy of these was given to Philip in 1457. One of the manuscripts of the Voyage records that Bertrandon died at Lille on 9 May 1459 and was buried in the collegiate church of Saint-Pierre.

== Le Voyage d'Outremer ==
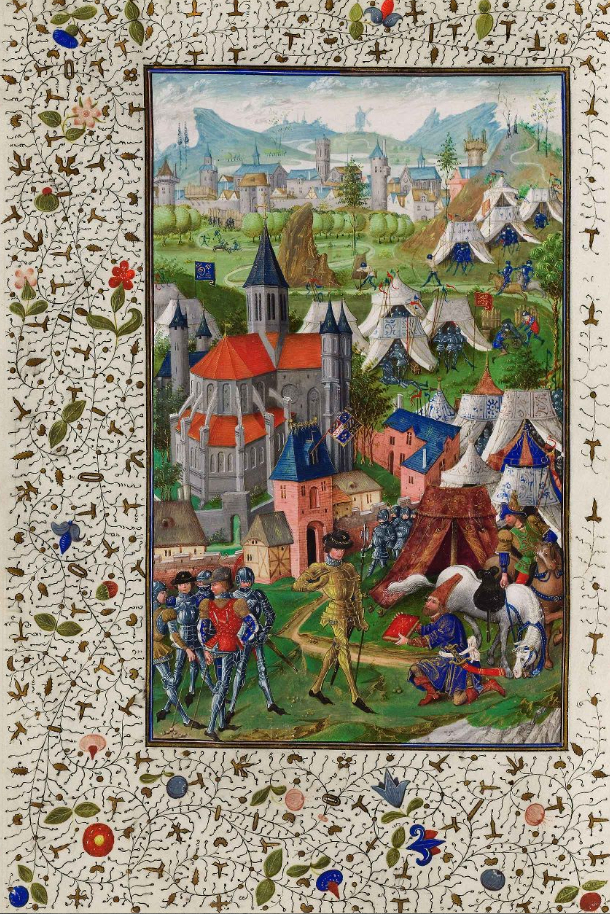
Bertrandon giving a Latin translation of the Koran to Duke Philip of Burgundy. Illustration (folio 152v) by Jean Le Tavernier from BnF, MS fr. 9087, made in Lille in 1455.

=== Ghent to Venice ===
Bertrandon de la Broquière left Ghent in February 1432. He took the route through Champagne and Burgundy to Italy. He first went to Rome, where he was received by Pope Eugene IV. On 25 March he set out from Rome for Venice, where he embarked on a galley bound for Jaffa on 8 May. The ship was loaded with pilgrims, many of them Burgundians. This part of the voyage is largely ignored in his memoires. He provides only brief descriptions of the Italian cities he passed through on his way to the sea.

=== Holy Land ===
After several stops at Venetian ports, in the Morea, on Corfu, on Rhodes and Cyprus, Bertrandon reached Jaffa. There he was forced to pay a tribute to the Egyptian sultan, the usual demand on pilgrims. From Jaffa he moved towards Jerusalem, which took two days. Probably he behaved as a regular pilgrim at the time, though he was also on a mission of observation.

He saw the image of the Notre Dame de Sardenay (Ṣaidnāyā), but called the healing oil supposedly sweating from it a "mere trick to get money", noting that both Christian and Saracen were devoted to the image. His stay in Jerusalem was short, after which he moved south to Gaza. There he and ten companions made preparations to cross the desert, despite the heat and the brigands, to visit the Saint Catherine's Monastery on Mount Sinai. Though Bertandon fell ill and had to turn back to Gaza, he does record the sighting of several exotic desert animals in his Voyage.

In Gaza he was nursed back to health by some Arabs, whom he admits in his Voyage were not as bad as often portrayed in Europe. They conducted him to Mount Zion, where he was placed in the care of the Conventual Franciscans. He wished to continue to visit the sites of the Holy Land, but on account of the political situation could not. He took an Arab ship from Jaffa to Beirut and there joined a mule team headed for Damascus. In Damascus met the French merchant Jacques Coeur and a Genoese merchant from Caffa who was working for Barsbay, Sultan of Egypt, to purchase slaves for his mameluke ranks.

=== Damascus to Constantinople ===
From Damascus he returned to Beirut, where he attended a nocturnal Arab festival that made a strong impression on him. He does, however, report the decline of Beirut, that Jaffa was nothing but a collection of tents covered in reeds, and that Acre had only 300 houses. In Beirut he decided to return to Europe by land, though pilgrims of the time usually took a boat back to Italy. At Damascus he had negotiated with the leader of a caravan, Kodja Barqouq, making its way from Mecca to Bursa. On the condition that he wear the Turkish costume, so as not to endanger his fellow travellers, he was permitted to accompany the caravan. The riches from Mecca greatly impressed him.

In the caravan Bertrandon met and befriended a mameluke, who taught him aspects of Turkish culture, cuisine and military custom. He also learned the rudiments of the Turkish language. The caravan stopped first in Antioch, crossed Little Armenia, and rounded the gulf of Alexandretta. The voyage across Asia Minor was relatively fast. At Iconium Bertrandon took leave of the caravan and joined an embassy headed to the Beylik of Karaman. When he finally arrived in Bursa, he took up lodging with a local Florentine for ten days. At Bursa he joined a company of European merchants, a Spaniard and three Florentines, and followed them to Pera.

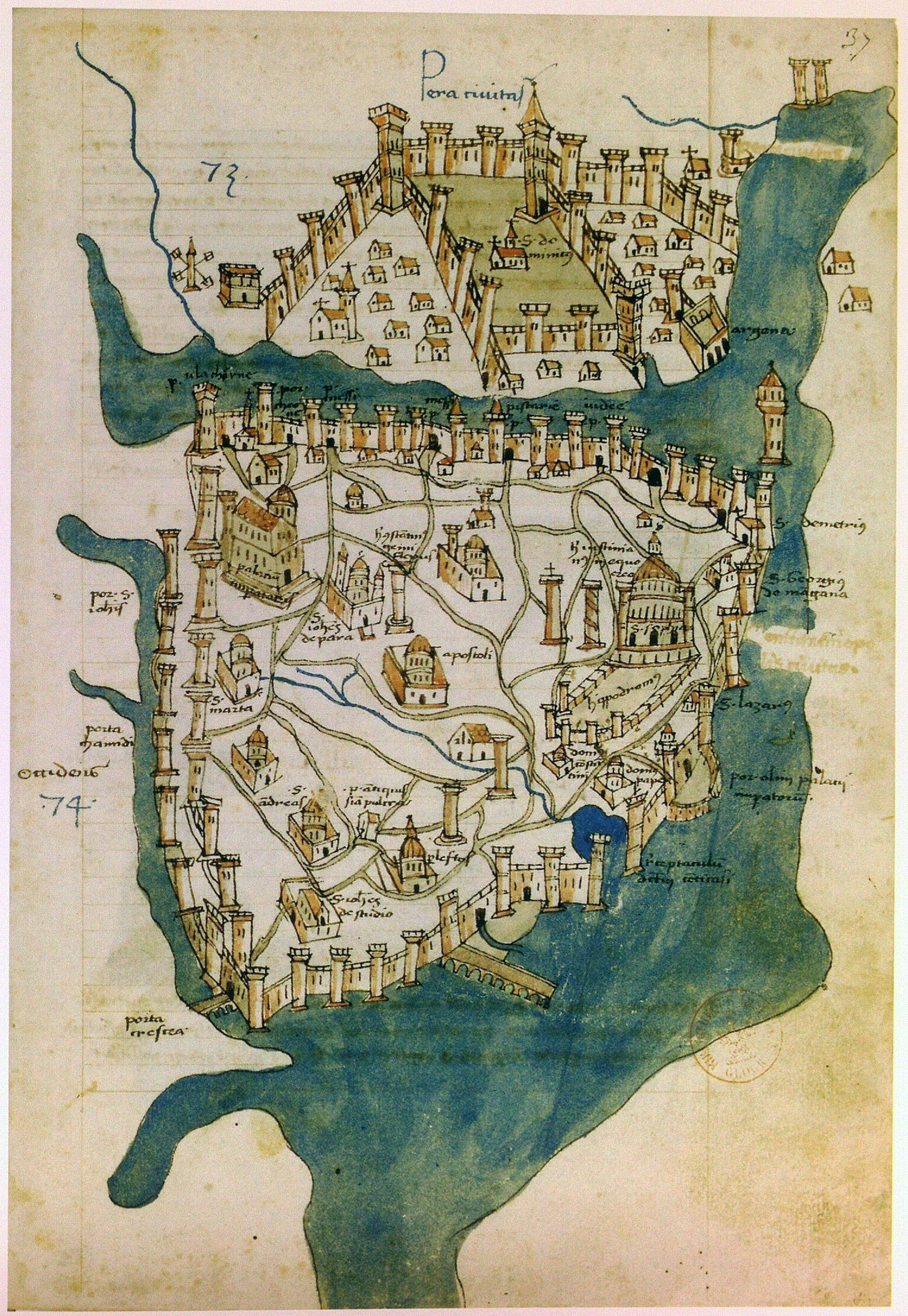
1422 map of Constantinople (Pera at top) by Florentine cartographer Cristoforo Buondelmonte

In Constantinople he took up with a Catalan merchant. The description of the city in his Voyage contains some interesting accounts of a joust and other ceremonies he attended, but very little on the city's architecture. He records a low opinion of the Emperor John VIII, describing him as an impotent tributary of the Ottoman sultan.

=== Constantinople to Burgundy ===
Bertrandon left Constantinople on 23 January 1433 in the company of Benedict Folco of Forlì, the ambassador of Filippo Maria Visconti, Duke of Milan, heading to the court of the Ottoman sultan Murad II at Adrianople, where they arrived late in February. Bertrandon records in his Voyage the sumptuous reception accorded the ambassador. On 12 March Bertrandon and Benedict left Adrianople. They visited Macedonia, Bulgaria, Albania, and Bosnia. He also visited Serbia and was well received by despot George Brankovic. Bertrandon records in his Voyage of this time that he found the Turks more friendly than Greeks. He and Benedict arrived in Belgrade on 12 April. It was there that Bertrandon began to think strategically about the conquest of the Ottoman Empire. He describes Turkish armies, armour, administration, and military system. In his Voyage he presents a plan to unite England, France, and Germany against the Turks. He says the conquest would be easy, but it is the Greeks—not the Turks—who do not trust the Westerners; the possibility of an alliance with the Greeks is slim. Murad, he writes, could conquer Europe with his resources, but he includes a copy of the report of the Venetian John Torcello in his Voyage, to buttress his claim that the Westerners are better armed. He and Benedict then traversed the Great Hungarian Plain and stopped in Buda, where they parted ways.

It took Bertrandon five days to get to Vienna from Buda, and there he was cordially welcomed by Duke Albert V of Austria, cousin of Philip the Good. Albert presented him with the first opposition to his plans. From Vienna Bertrandon took six days to arrive at Linz. He took the route through Bavaria and Swabia to Basel, where he attended a meeting of the Council of Basel. He reentered Burgundy at Montbéliard. At the abbey of Pothières in the Côte d'Or early in July he reported to Philip the Good. He gave him a copy of the Koran and a life of Mohammed translated into Latin by the chaplain of the Venetian consul at Damascus. He also gave him his clothes and his horse, both acquired from the East. The duke gave the Koran and the vita to bishop John Germain, the chancellor of the Order of the Golden Fleece, but kept the robes.
