= Bigot Roll of Arms =

The Bigot Roll of Arms (French - Rôle d'armes Bigot) or Bigot Armorial (Armorial Bigot is one earliest known surviving armorials. · It is made up of coats of arms belonging to 259 knights who fought for Charles d'Anjou in Hainaut in 1254. · This places it in the sub-category of 'occasional rolls of arms'.

Compiled in the mid 13th century by an unknown author, it only survives in a single 17th century copy, the original having been lost. That copy is bound between folios 32 and 39 of Manuscrit FR. 18648 in M. Jean Bigot's library in Rouen and is thus named after him. The copy is probably corrupted and incomplete and the document's original structure is still a matter of debate.

It is highly thought of among specialists and forms an important source for medieval heraldry. Modern editions of it have been produced by Paul Adam-Even (1949) and Robert Nussard (1985), who included critical commentaries. In the 1960s François Avril published several studies on it. · .
