= First Bible of Charles the Bald =

9th-century Bible

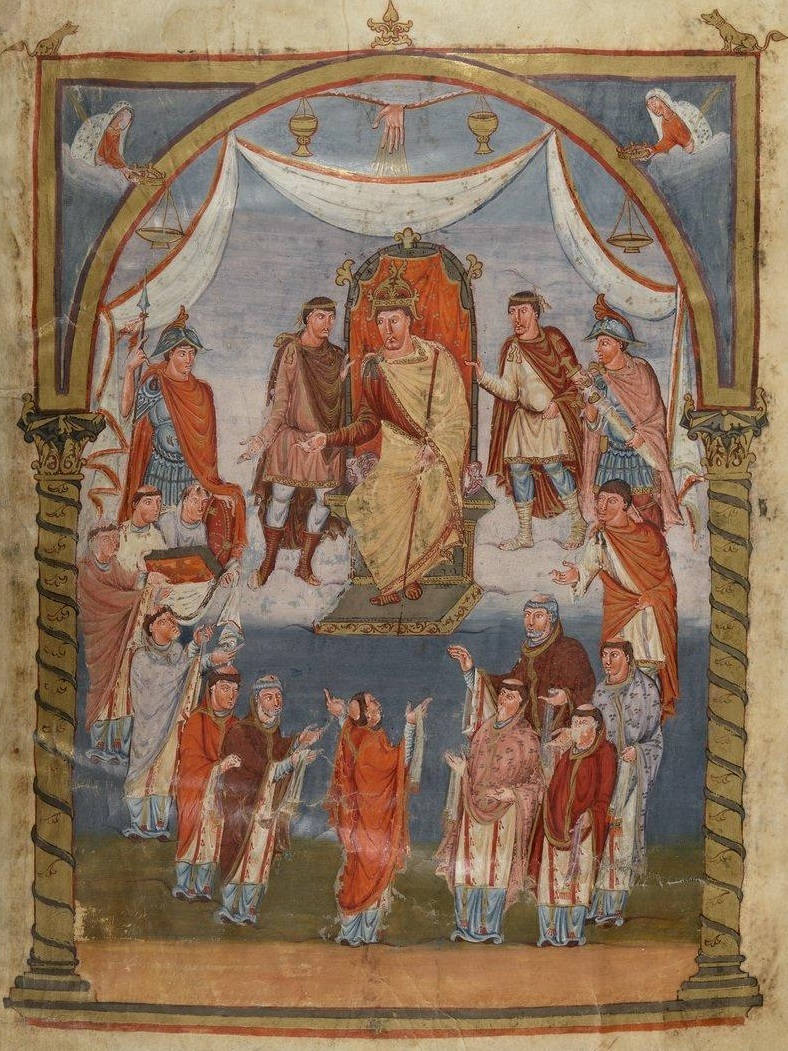
Charles the Bald receives the book, in the presentation miniature (fol. 423)

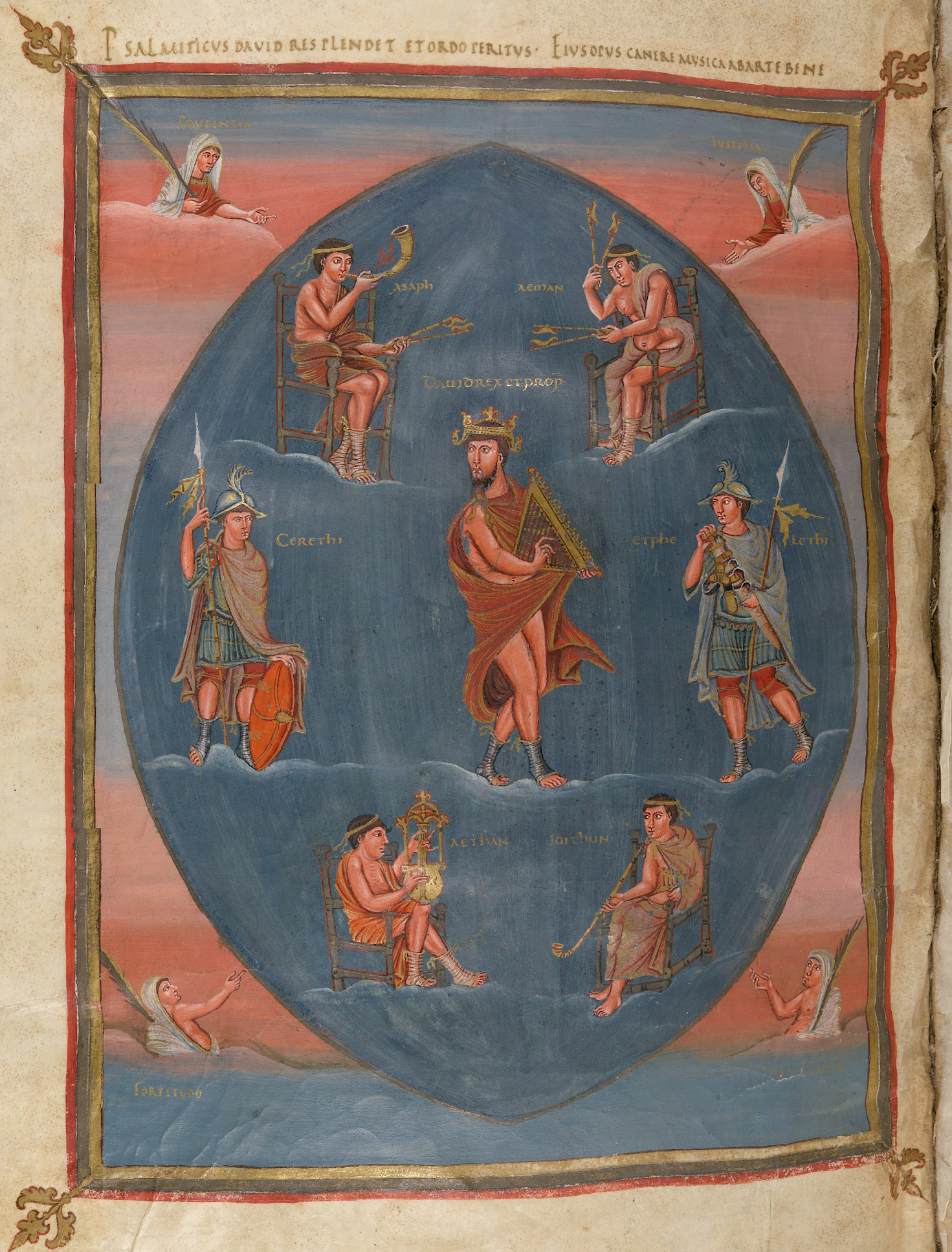
David Composing Psalms. Vivian Bible. Tours, c. 845.

The First Bible of Charles the Bald (BNF Lat. 1), also known as the Vivian Bible, is a Carolingian-era Bible commissioned by Count Vivian of Tours in 845, the lay abbot of Saint-Martin de Tours, and presented to Charles the Bald in 846 on a visit to the church, as shown in the presentation miniature at the end of the book. It is 495 mm by 345 mm and has 423 vellum folia. It is now in the Bibliothèque nationale de France in Paris.

Bible de Vivien, BnF Ms. Lat. 1, fol. 239v

It is also thought to be the third illuminated Bible to have been made at Tours following the Bamberg Alcuin Bible (Staatsbibliothek Bamberg Msc. Bibl. 1) and Moutier-Grandval Bible (British Library Add MS 10546).

The Vivian Bible contains many illuminations, including the Psalms frontispiece, depicting David Composing Psalms, and the presentation miniature, in which Charles the Bald receives the book. The psalms frontispiece is said to have connections with the prophet Audradas because of the writing above David's head. This connection can also be seen with the four virtues which are in the corners of the painting. These virtues are depicted as women on clouds with their arms outstretched. We can see David's guards, who also have a symbolic meaning. They are meant to represent two Old Testament families that guarded David. Along with the guards we see David at the center who is playing the lyre, and his four musicians. All these figures are held within a large mandorla, illustrating the heavenly realm. David appears naked with just a bit of drapery covering his upper half. This is representative of David's modesty and humility.

The presentation miniature is an illumination of Charles the Bald receiving the Vivian Bible when he was just 22 years old. The illumination includes both the Pope and Charles the Bald, showing how the Pope and rulers were becoming reliant on each other during the Carolingian period. This illumination replaced the apocalypse miniature as the tailpiece of the Vivian Bible. The illumination has the figures arranged in a circle. This makes it look like a procession is occurring in the image. Additionally, Charles seems like a mediator between God and man, evident with the hand of God and the curtains that frame the enthroned Charles at the center. There is some uncertainty as to who exactly each person in this image is. The men to Charles' left and right are not described in the text of the bible, but it is thought that they might be palace officials. In the center right it is thought that the figure is Vivian. It was originally thought the man with his back turned to the viewer was Vivian, but this is the Pater (the father). There are also guards in this image which are like the guards in David composing the psalms. These guards are representative of Charles' military force.
