= Presentation miniature =

Dedicatory illustration in Medieval manuscripts

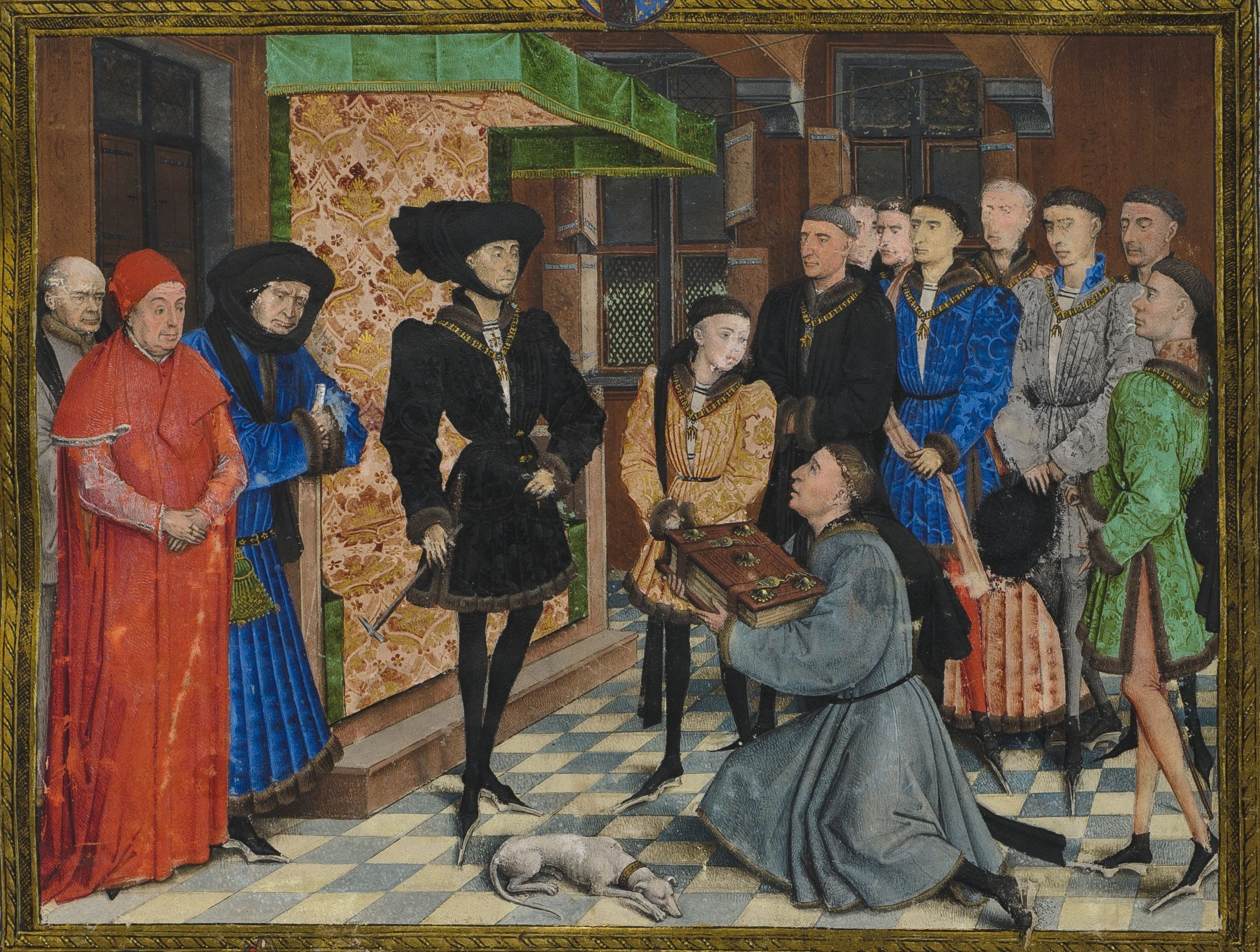
Rogier van der Weyden, Jean Wauquelin presenting his 'Chroniques de Hainaut' to Philip the Good, c 1448

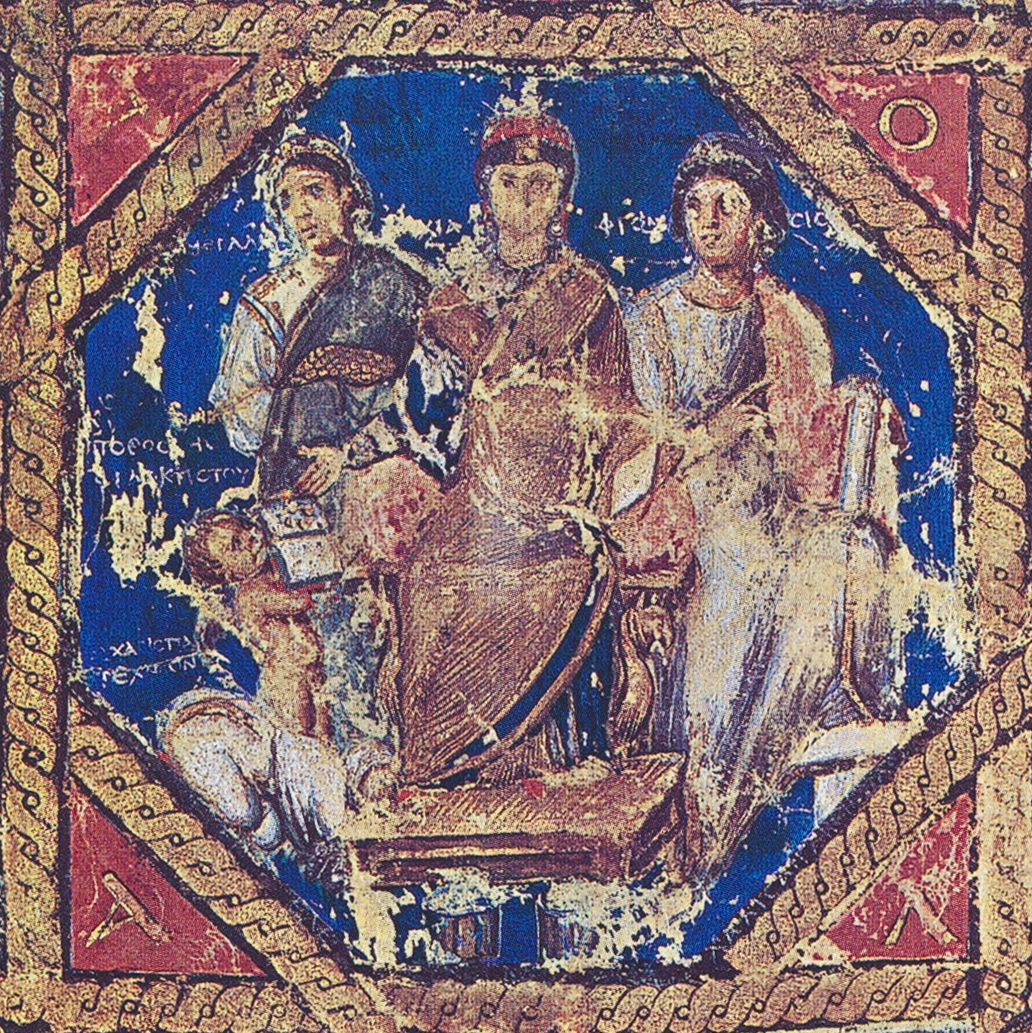
The patrikia Anicia Juliana receives the Vienna Dioscurides from a putto, flanked by Megalopsychia and Phronesis (folio 6v)

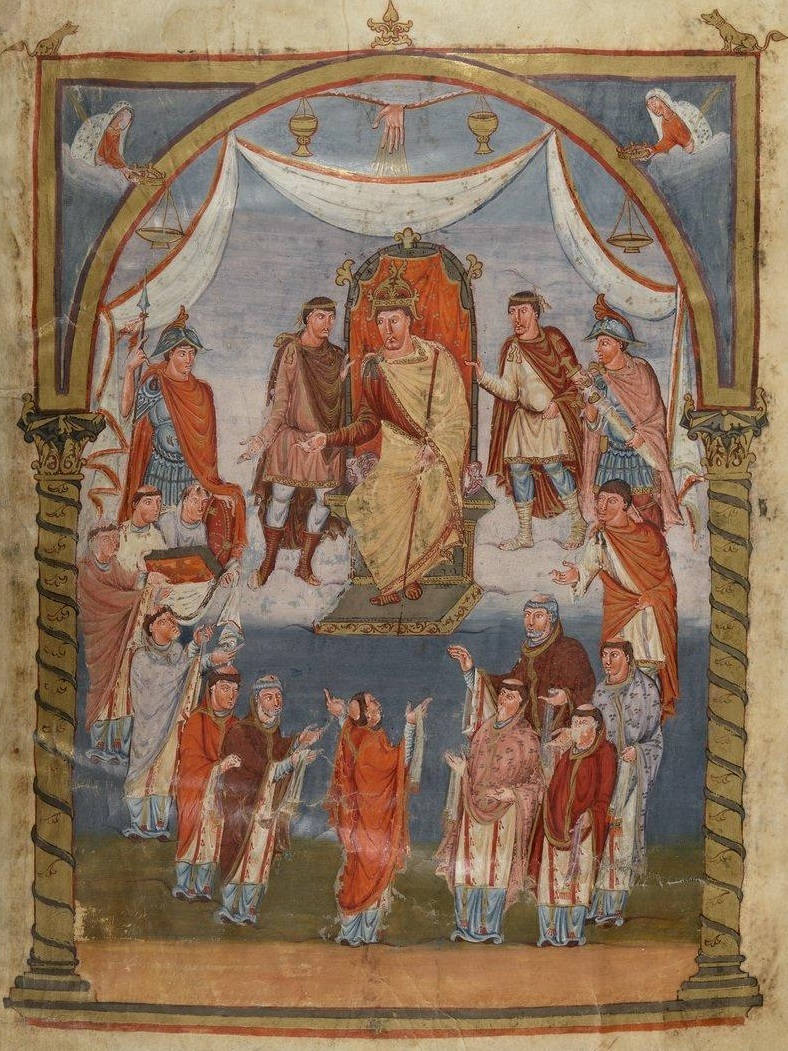
Charles the Bald receives the Vivian Bible from the monks of Tours in 845 (fol. 423)

A presentation miniature or dedication miniature is a miniature painting often found in illuminated manuscripts, in which the patron or donor is presented with a book, normally to be interpreted as the book containing the miniature itself. The miniature is thus symbolic, and presumably represents an event in the future. Usually it is found at the start of the volume, as a frontispiece before the main text, but may also be placed at the end, as in the Vivian Bible, or at the start of a particular text in a collection.

In earlier manuscripts the recipient of the book may be a dead saint, the founder of a monastery or monastic order, for example, and the person handing over the book the abbot, or sometimes the scribe of the book. The genre is an extension of other forms of dedication portraits, for example wall-paintings or mosaics in churches showing the person who commissioned the church holding a model of it. Ultimately they stretch back to scenes where classical rulers receive tribute, or those where a procession of Early Christian martyrs carry their crowns to present Christ. The miniatures are often found in luxury books presented to the emperor or another major figure, which usually followed significant donations of land to the monastery concerned.

In the early period the manuscripts concerned are normally religious books, especially liturgical ones. The texts are old, and the "offering" represented is the creation of an expensive illuminated manuscript. In the late Middle Ages works, often secular ones, are generally presented by their author or translator, though lavish copies of older texts may also still receive presentation miniatures. In these first cases the "offering" is usually the text itself, and the patron had presumably often paid for his own luxury copy himself, though some translators and even authors were also scribes. Now the text dedication to the patron, at this period often long and flowery, came to form part of the work itself, and at least the text was repeated in further copies. Such author's dedications, now far shorter, have remained part of the printed book. Sometimes presentation miniatures were also repeated in subsequent copies.

Michelle Brown distinguishes between presentation miniatures, where the actual book containing the miniature passed between the parties shown, and dedication miniatures in subsequent copies made for other people.

== Early medieval ==
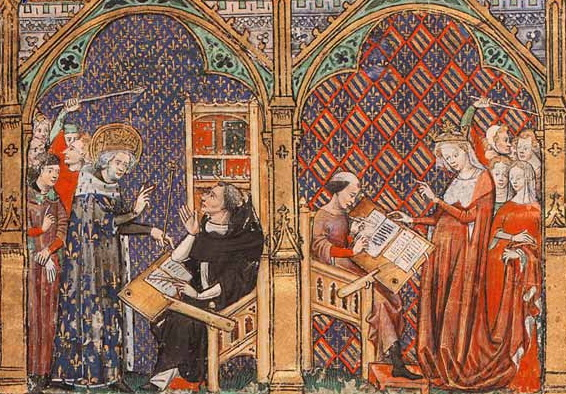
Two royal visits to respectively the author and translator of Vincent de Beauvais's work translated in French by Jean de Vignay as Le Miroir historial, c. 1333

Royal presentation miniatures are especially a feature of Late Carolingian and Ottonian art, providing a series of portraits of the Ottonian emperors, mostly not actually shown with the book, and a precedent for later rulers. In a continuation and intensification of late Carolingian trends, many miniatures contain miniatures depicting the donors of the manuscripts to a church, including bishops, abbots and abbesses, and also the emperor.

In some cases successive miniatures show a kind of relay: in the Hornbach Sacramentary the scribe presents the book to his abbot, who presents it to St Pirmin, founder of Hornbach Abbey, who presents it to St Peter, who presents it to Christ, altogether taking up eight pages (with the facing illuminated tablets) to stress the unity and importance of the "command structure" binding church and state, on earth and in heaven. The Egbert Psalter also has four pages of presentation scenes, with two each spread across a full opening, the left with a bowing offeror in near profile, the right with the enthroned receiver. Egbert, Archbishop of Trier receives the book in the first pair, then presents it to Saint Peter in the second.

A large proportion of the portraits that survive of monastic scribes, who may also have been the artists for the miniatures, come from presentation miniatures, more typically showing presentations to either saints or other clergy who had commissioned books. Such scenes continue to appear in the Romanesque period.

The earliest surviving portrait of a reigning English king (coins excepted) and the earliest English presentation miniature shows Æthelstan presenting Saint Cuthbert with the copy of Bede's Life of Saint Cuthbert containing it, probably in 934. This was presented by Æthelstan to the saint's shrine in Chester-le-Street; southern-based medieval English kings were always careful to pay due respect to Cuthbert, the great saint of the North.

In the High Middle Ages presentation miniatures in luxury copies of the main liturgical and devotional books, showing the book being presented, tended to be replaced by miniatures of the owner or donor at prayer, sometimes using a book which can be taken as the volume containing the miniature. These often include the object of the prayer, Christ, the Virgin Mary, or a saint. Sometimes the owner is shown being "presented" to Christ or the Virgin by his patron saint, as though at court, but these are not generally called "presentation miniatures".

The form did not die out, however. The earliest surviving copy of the Grandes Chroniques de France was presented by the monks of Saint-Denis, who had compiled the text, to Philip III in about 1274, with two presentation scenes, though neither act as frontispieces.

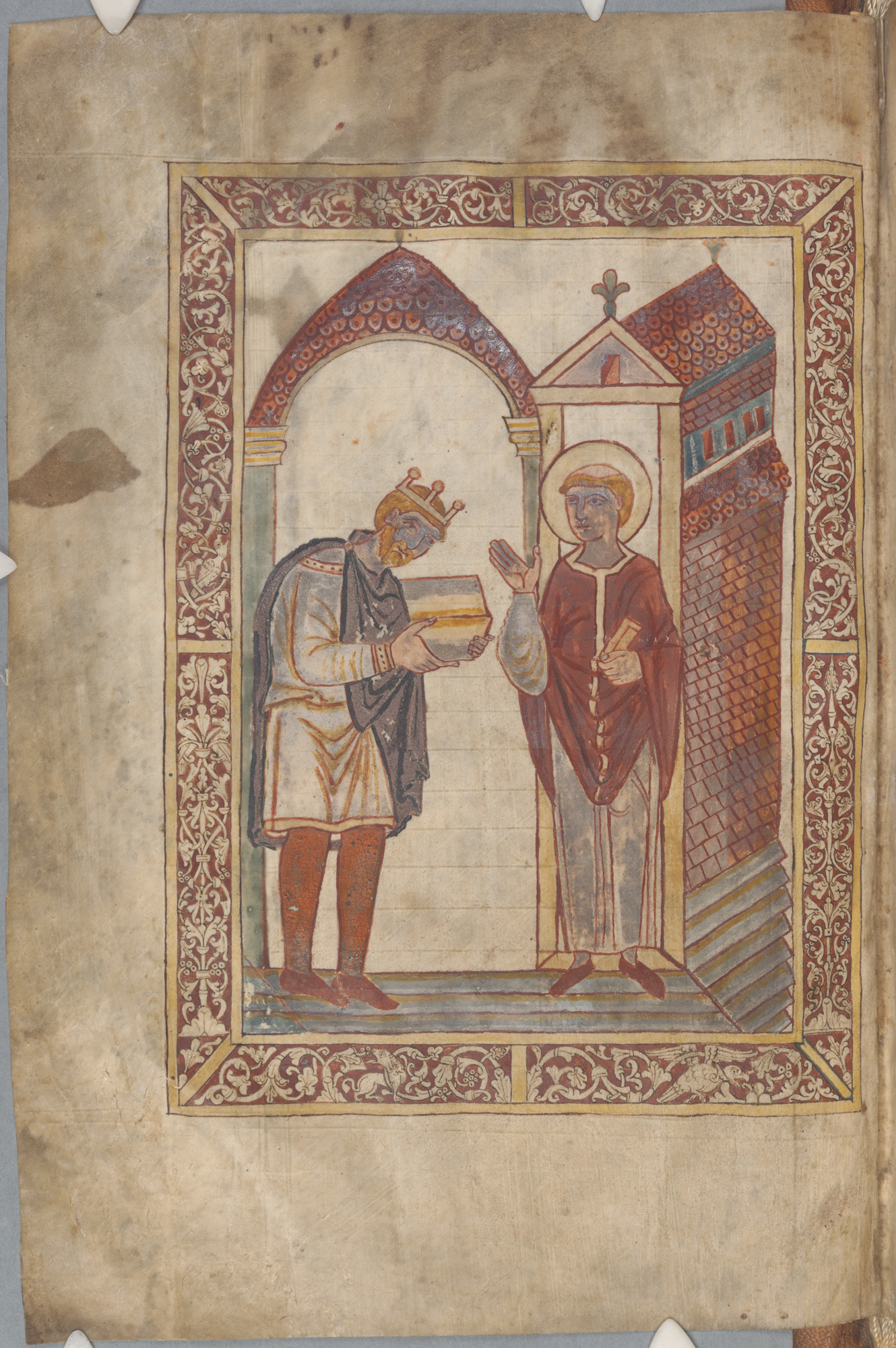
Æthelstan presenting a manuscript of Bede's Life of Saint Cuthbert to Cuthbert, the earliest surviving portrait of a reigning English king.

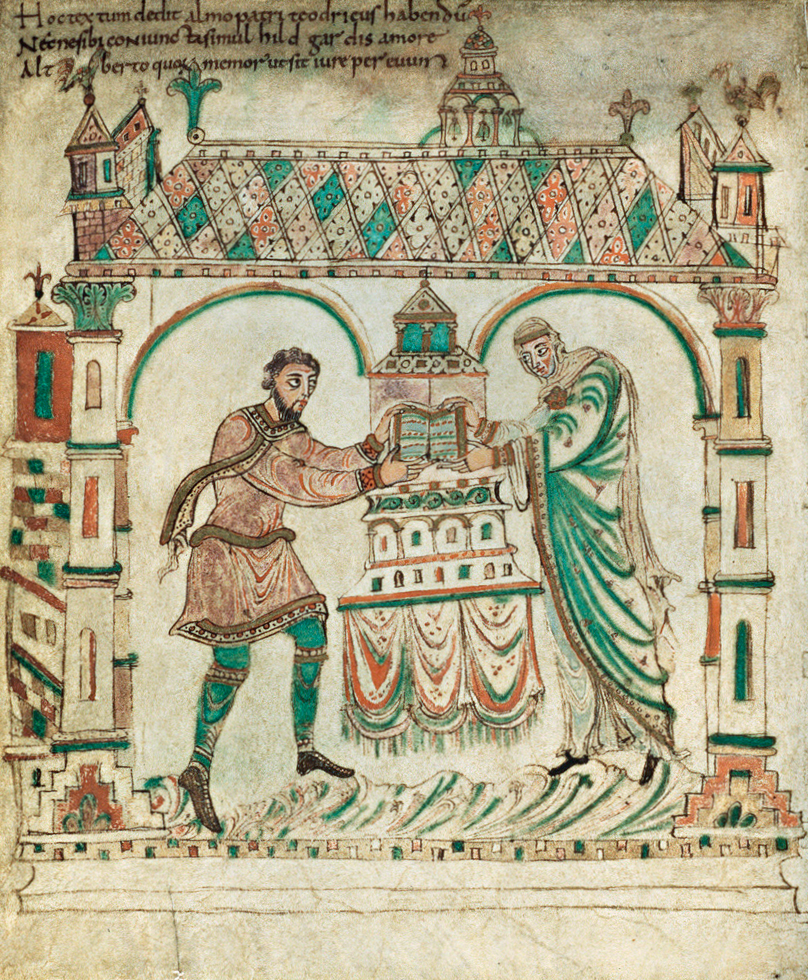
Dirk II, Count of Holland and his wife Hildegard of Flanders presenting the Egmond Gospels to Egmond Abbey, c. 975

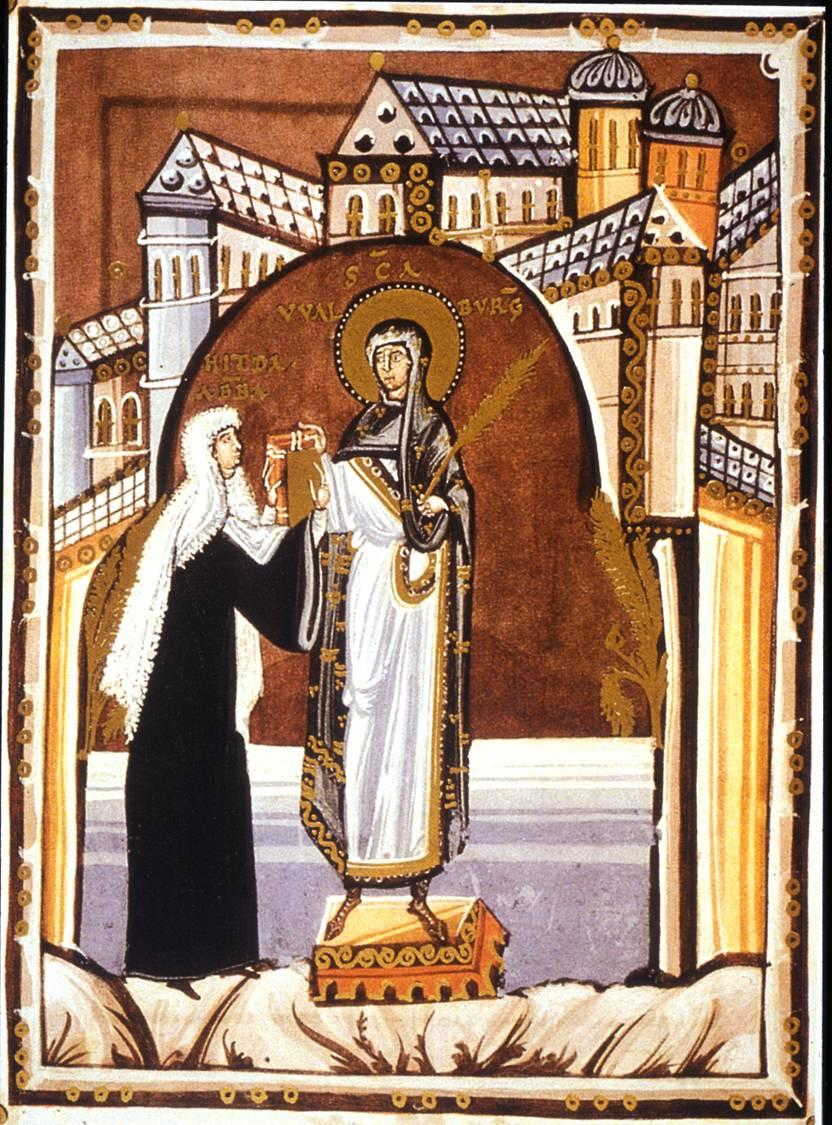
Abbess Hitda presents the Hitda Codex to Saint Walpurga, c. 1020

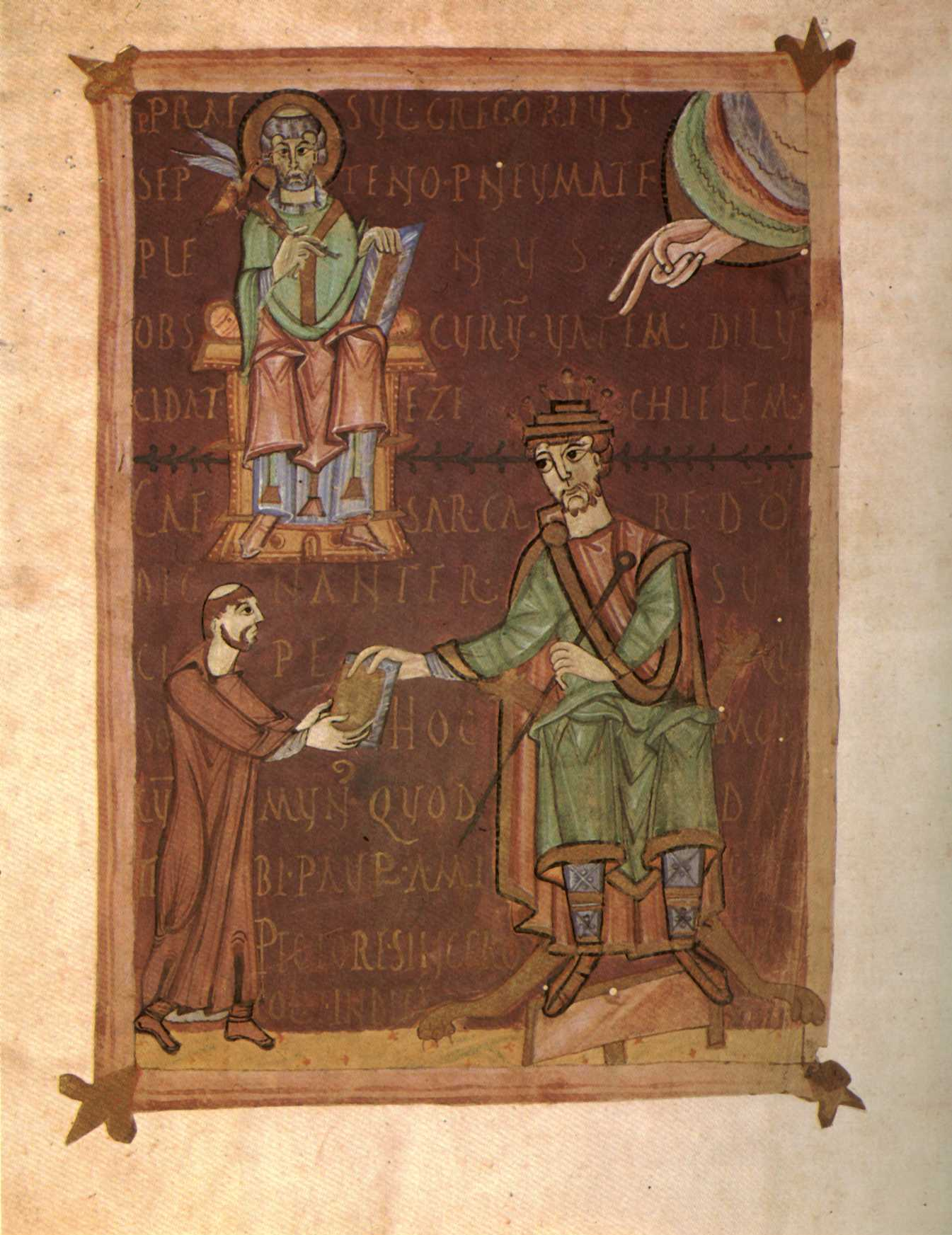
The scribe Bebo of Seeon Abbey, presenting his copy of St Gregory's Moralia in Job to Emperor Henry II, 11th century

== Late medieval ==
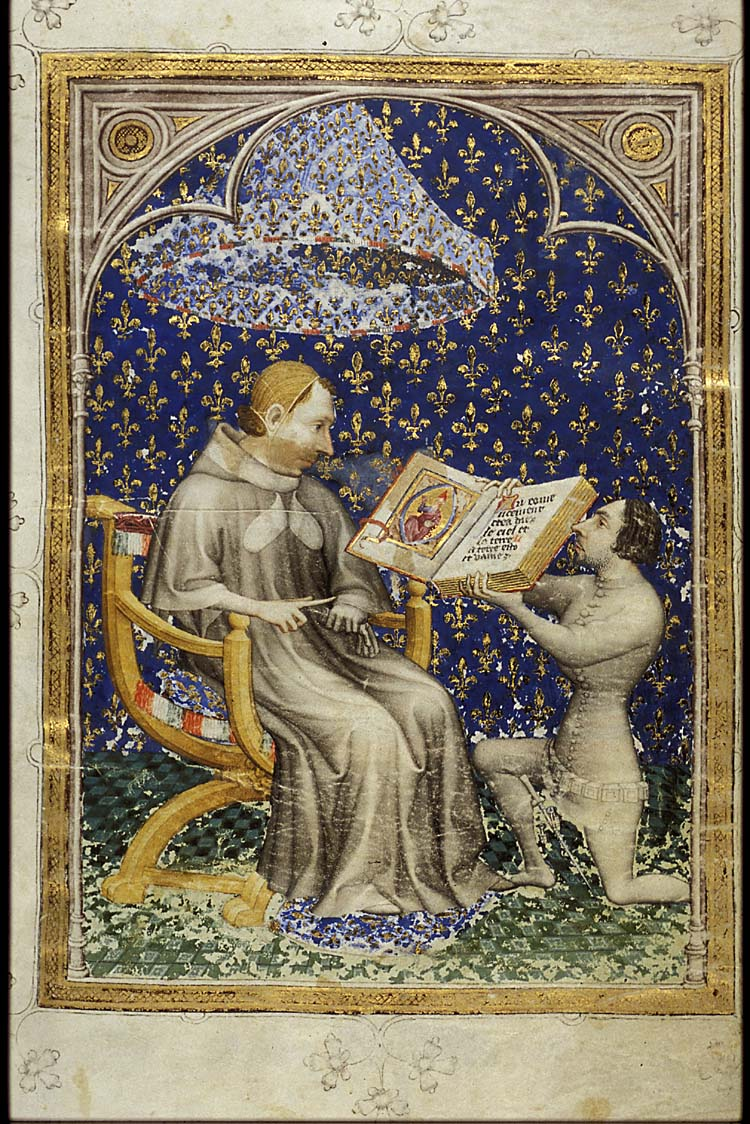
Jean de Vaudetar, valet de chambre to King Charles V of France, presents the king with his gift of a Bible Historiale in 1372. Miniature by Jean Bondol, who was also a valet de chambre. Vaudetar was a nobleman, already in charge of the Louvre palace, who was to progress further at court.

As book culture increased in the Late Middle Ages, authors still relied on gifts from patrons to reward their efforts, and it is in this context that the dedication miniature revived. Very often the miniature was in the personal copy made by the patron for his library. The author or translator kneels, holding out his book, and the patron is often surrounded by a group of courtiers, advertising his generosity in encouraging literature. These images generally focus on a single moment of the ritual, unlike written accounts, which offer a greater narrative range of actions. The public and ceremonial presentation of gifts from, but mostly to, the monarch or lord was a great feature of medieval court life, concentrated on the New Year. A high proportion of the surviving portraits of late medieval scholars and artists, and a significant proportion of those of the patrons, come from these miniatures, many of which show individualized features and were probably by artists who had had good opportunity to observe their subjects.

The French royal family, including their Burgundian cousins, led the fashion, which spread to England and elsewhere. Extensively illuminated books were also presented to royalty as diplomatic gifts, or by ambitious courtiers to the monarch, and these might include presentation miniatures. Sometimes the presentation miniature might be the only one in a book; such was the case with Louis de Gruuthuse's copy of Boccaccio's De mulieribus claris translated into French (BnF, Ms Fr. 133, f 2r).

King Charles V of France (r. 1338–1380), one of the first great bibliophile medieval monarchs, had a large library and especially encouraged and commissioned translations of books into French, which were very often given a presentation miniature. He continues to be shown in dedication miniatures a century after his death. Louis de Gruuthuse's copy of about 1470 of the Pseudo-Seneca's De remediis fortuitorum translated into French for Charles V has a miniature showing the king receiving the text, but with de Gruuthuse standing to the side (BnF, Ms. fr. 1090, fol. 1). The copy made about 1475 for Margaret of York, Duchess of Burgundy had a different image. This is a double presentation where firstly Seneca himself hands the text to the translator, who bends a knee to receive it, and then down a passageway in the background the translator kneels to present it to two male figures.

As here, dedication miniatures for old texts sometimes go well back in history, sometimes giving historic figures the features of contemporary ones. Guillebert de Lannoy (1386–1462), a leading Burgundian nobleman, diplomat and traveller, wrote around 1440 L'Instruction de josne prince ("Advice for a Young Prince"), which he dressed up with a fictional origin in the court of Norway "long, long ago", followed by a rediscovery of the manuscript text. The dedication miniature in Charles the Bold's copy illustrates the Norwegian story, but using up-to-date Burgundian costume and, it seems, the faces of the ducal family. Another variation was to show the patron visiting the author, or even the illuminator, as they worked, an indication in the rise in status of those producing manuscripts.

The form survived the arrival of printed books, though they became much rarer. When Edward IV of England's brother in law, Anthony Woodville, 2nd Earl Rivers had William Caxton print his own translation of the Dictes and Sayings of the Philosophers in 1477, the book he presented to Edward was a special manuscript copied from the printed edition, with a presentation miniature, implying "that a printed book might not yet have been regarded as sufficiently distinguished for a formal gift of this kind". Some printed books continued the form in woodcut, with printers such as Antoine Vérard in Paris joining the types of presenters depicted.

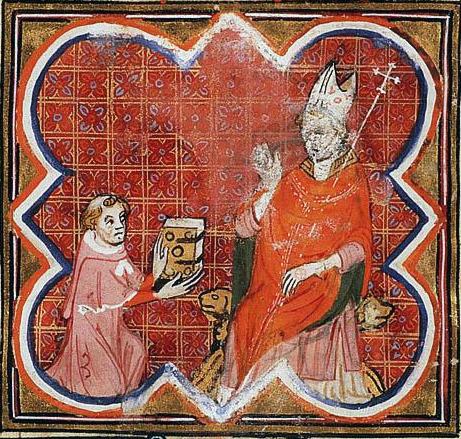
Petrus Comestor (d. c. 1178) presents his Historia scholastica to Archbishop Guillaume of Sens. From a Bible Historiale of 1370-80, which mixed sections of the Historia with sections of the Vulgate Bible

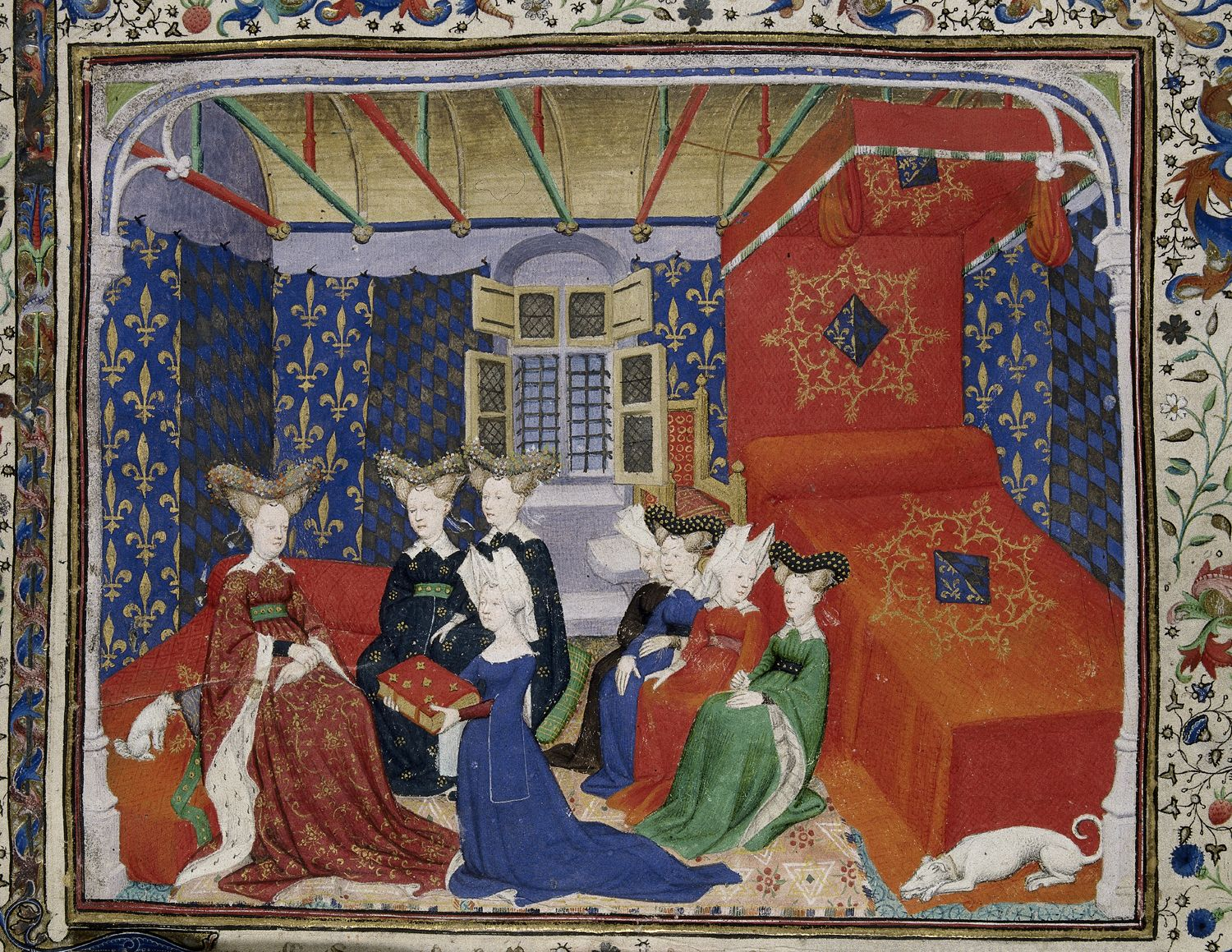
Christine de Pizan presenting her collected works to Queen Isabeau of Bavaria, miniature by the Master of the Cité des dames, c. 1410.

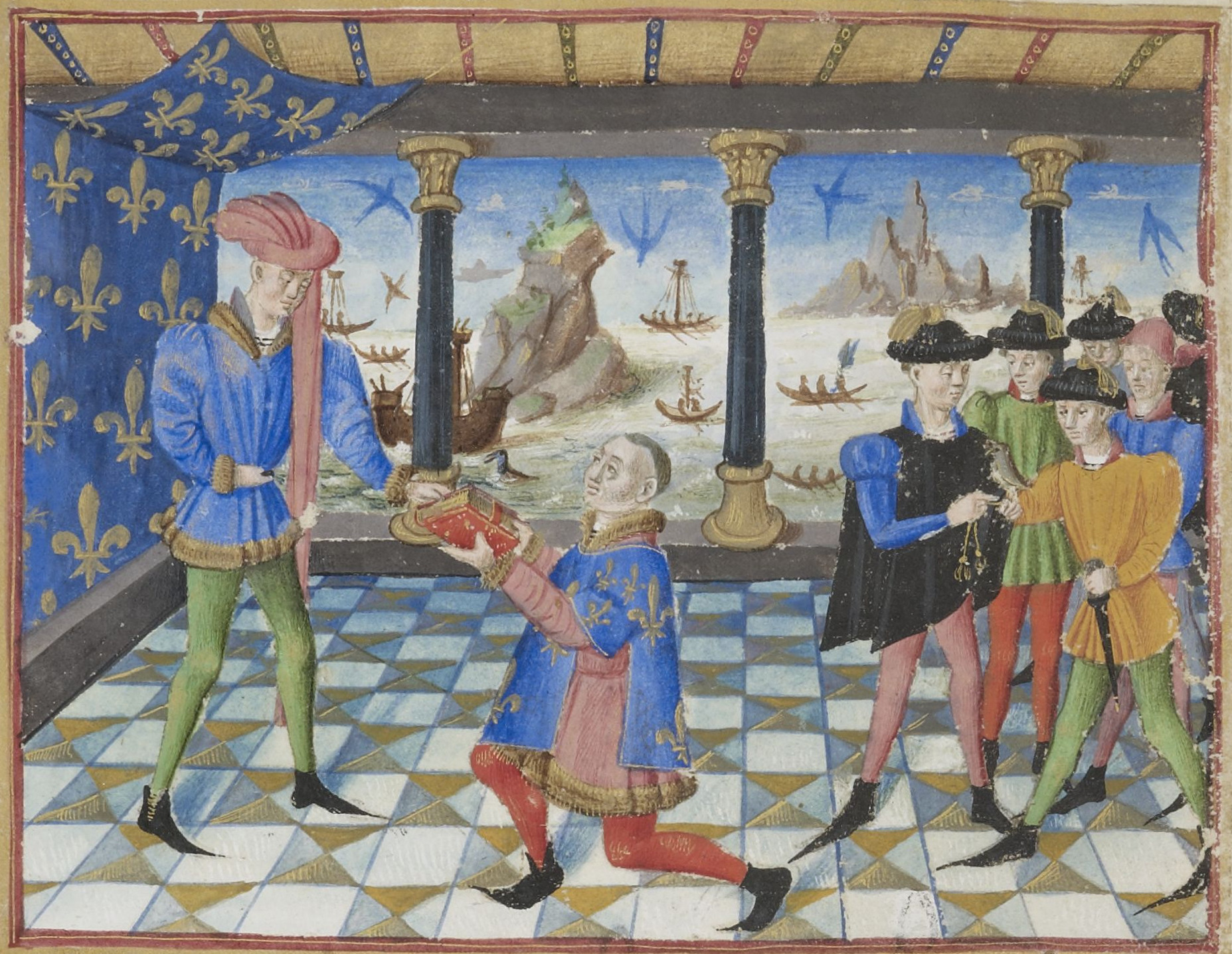
Herald Gilles Le Bouvier presenting the Armorial of Gilles Le Bouvier to Charles VII of France c. 1455.

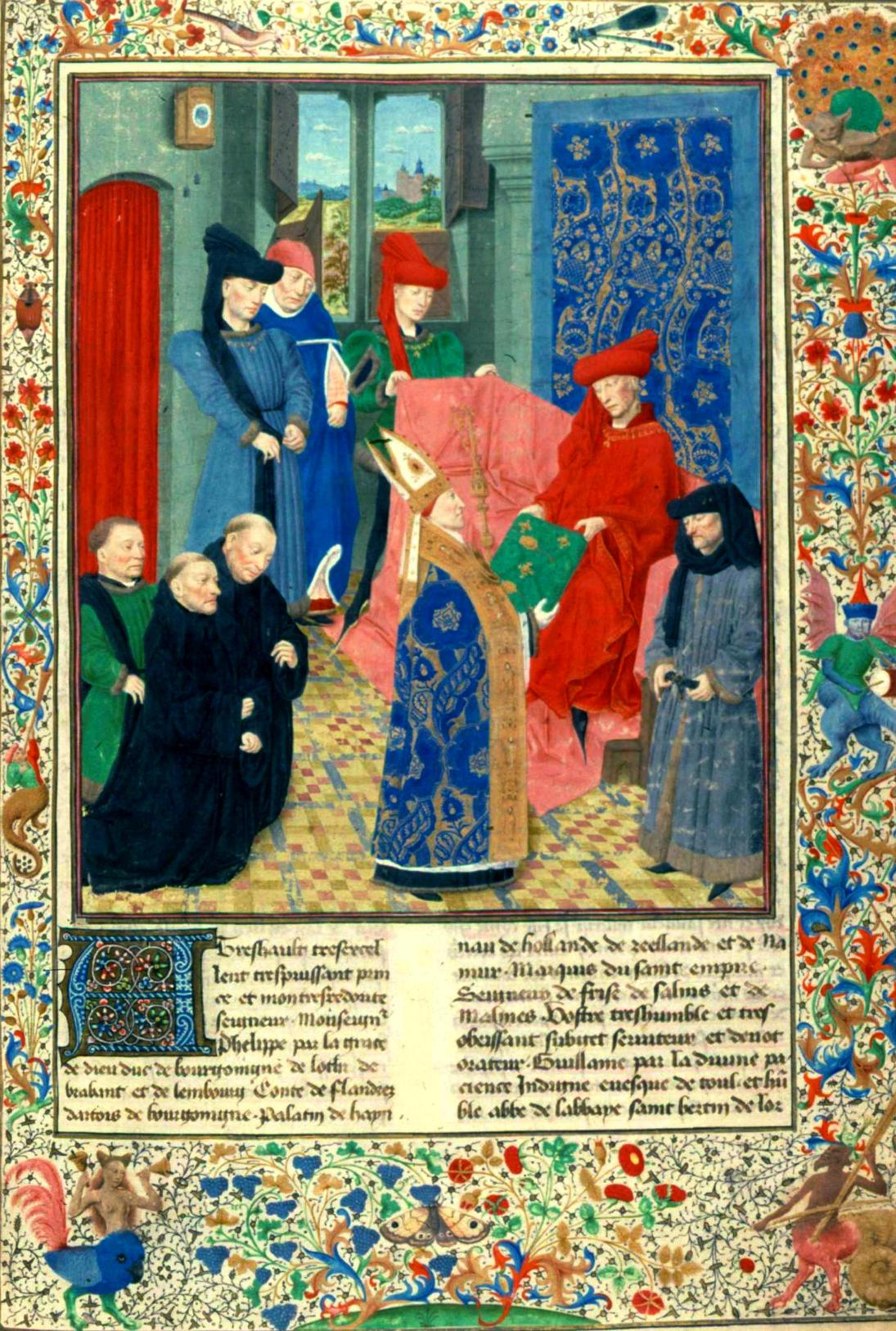
Philip the Good with Chancellor Rolin and the future Charles the Bold accepts the Grandes Chroniques de France from Guillaume Fillastre on January 1, 1457. By Simon Marmion, probably the figure at left.

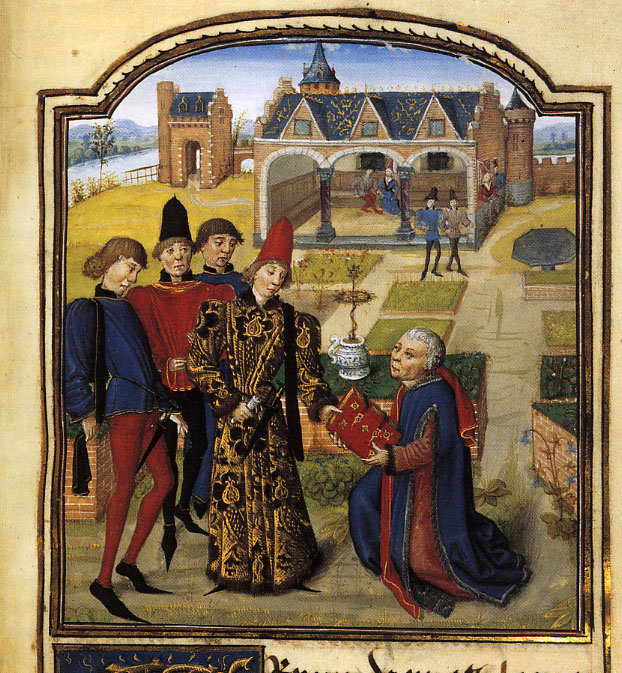
A fictional author, "Foliant de Ionnal", presents his text to a fictional king, "Rudolph of Norway", in L'Instruction d'un jeune prince, an advice book on good conduct actually by Guillebert de Lannoy, c. 1468-70. Artist: Jean Hennecart.

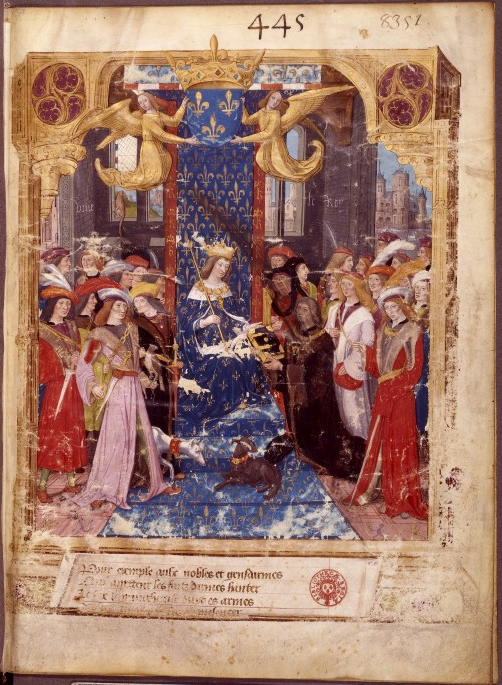
A diplomatic gift; A Burgundian ambassador, Louis de Gruuthuse presents Charles VIII of France with a copy of Le Livre des tournois by the king's cousin René of Anjou, 1489.

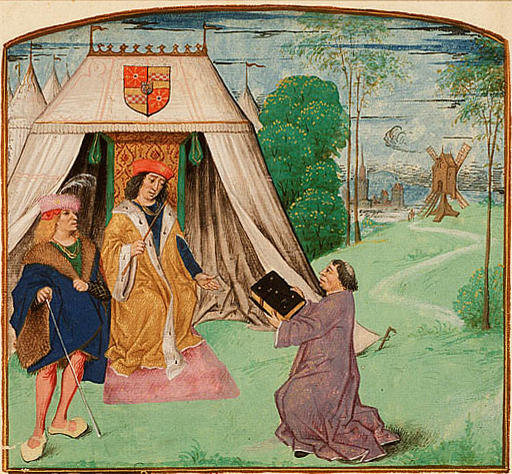
Jean Molinet presents his Le Roman de la Rose moralisé et translaté de rime en prose to Philip of Cleves, c. 1500

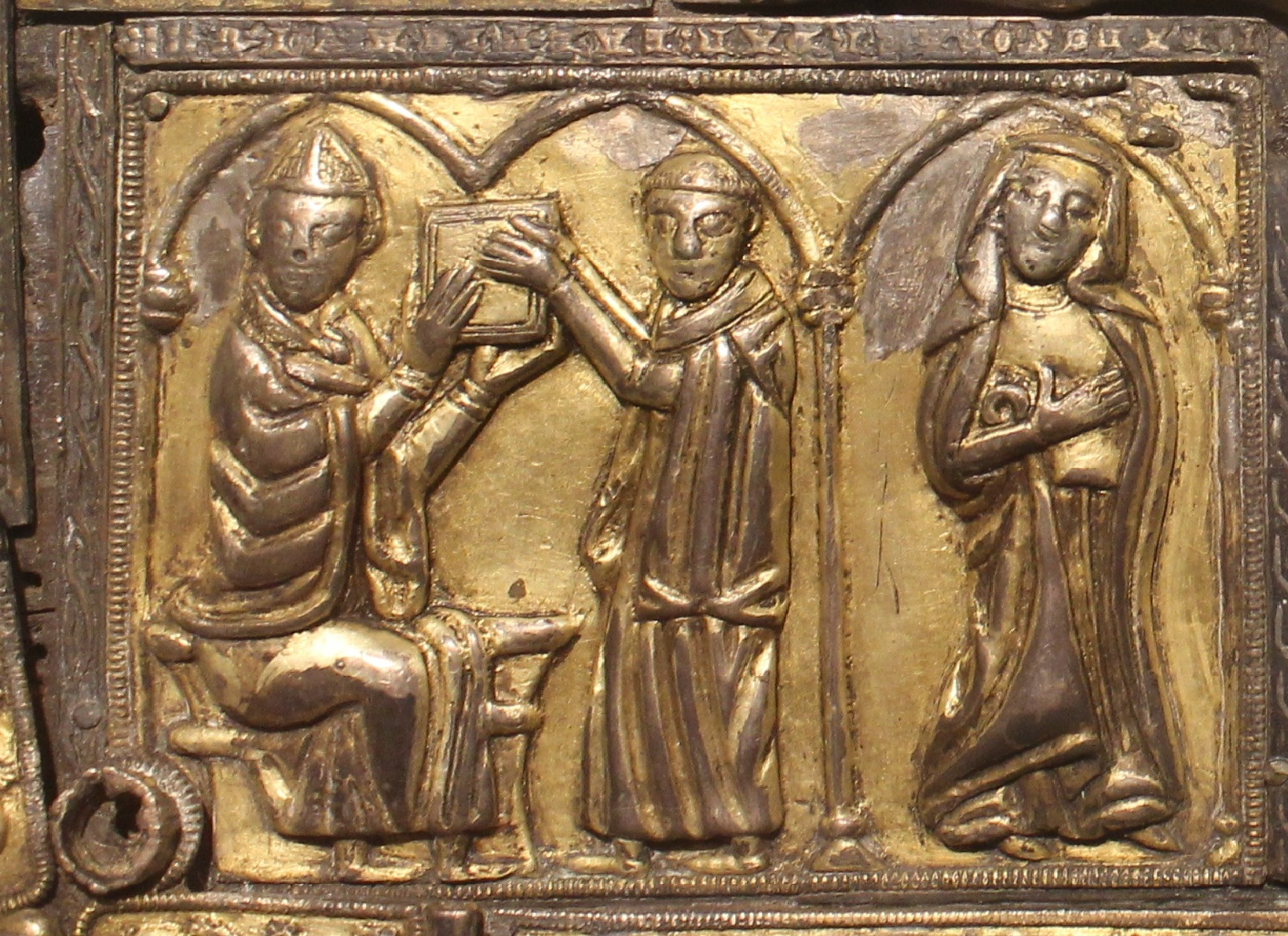
A version of the Domnach Airgid Cumdach (book shrine) is presented by Saint Patrick to St Macartan in a mise en abyme type that later became known as the Droste effect. Irish, 14th century.
