= Jean Hennecart =

15th-century court artist and illuminator

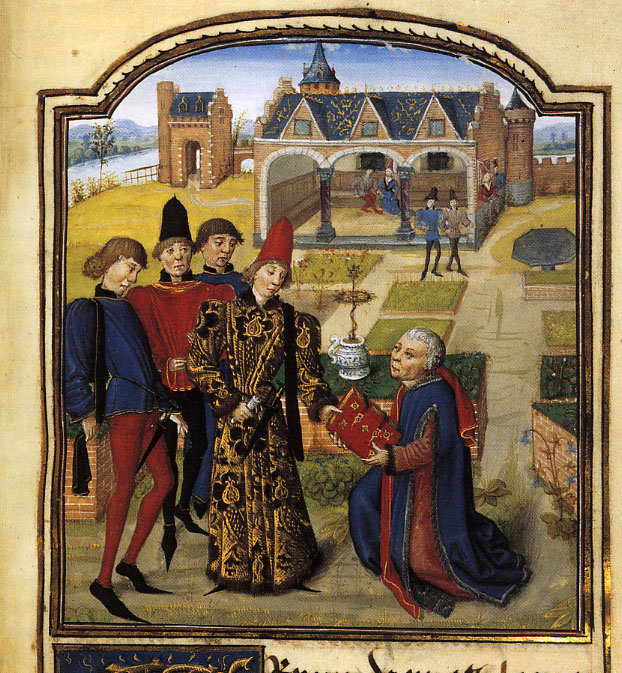
Presentation miniature by Jean Hennecart (Bibliothèque de l'Arsenal, Ms. 5104, folio 14)

Jean Hennecart (also Hennequart, fl. 1454–1470) was a Burgundian court painter and manuscript illuminator from Oudenaarde. He was in the employment of both Philip the Good and Charles the Bold.

== Biography ==
Jean Hennecart was from Oudenaarde. His name is mentioned several times in account books of the court of both Philip the Good and Charles the Bold. The first his name appears in records is in 1454, in connection with the preparations for the Feast of the Pheasant, when he and another artist, Jean Le Tavernier, were paid for twelve days of working on the decorations. Probably from at least 1457, he was court painter for Charles the Bold, and continued to serve him since he succeeded his father as Duke of Burgundy. He made a wide range of decorative works for Charles the Bold, including designs for jewellery, heraldry, and objects for use at various festive occasions. He also worked as a book illuminator, though confirmed illustrations by his hand are only preserved in a single work. Stylistically, his illustrations show influences from Rogier van der Weyden (visible in a presentation miniature), the Master of Girart de Roussillon and the Master of Anthony of Burgundy (particularly noticeable in the depiction of clothes).

== Sources cited ==
- Kren, Thomas; McKendrick, Scot, eds. (2003). Illuminating the Renaissance: The Triumph of Flemish Manuscript Painting in Europe. Los Angeles: Getty Publications. ISBN 0-89236-703-2.
- Campbell, Gordon, ed. (2009). The Grove encyclopedia of northern Renaissance art. Vol. 2. Oxford University Press. ISBN 978-0-19-533466-1.
