= Jean Le Tavernier =

15th-century illuminator

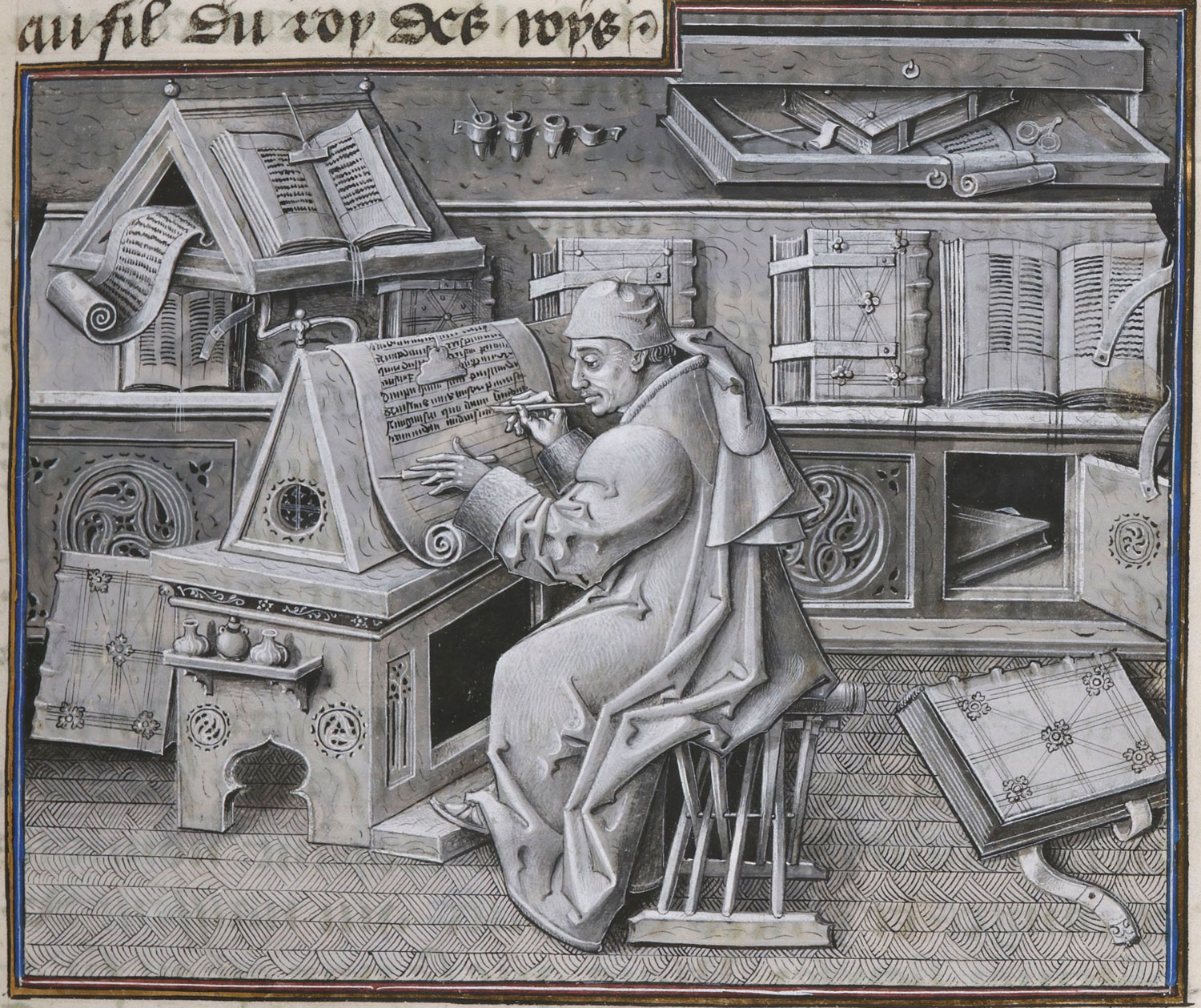
Illumination in grisaille by Jean Le Tavernier, depicting author Jean Miélot. Le Tavernier illustrated several works of Miélot.

Jean Le Tavernier, also known as Johannes de Tavernier (fl. 1434–1460), was an artist from the Southern Netherlands, He was possibly from the city of Oudenaarde. He was a painter of illuminated manuscripts and specialised in grisaille painting. Jean Le Tavernier received several commissions from the Burgundian Court and the Duke of Burgundy Philip the Good. He developed a highly personal style, influenced by near-contemporary panel painting.

== Biography ==
Jean Le Tavernier may have come from a family of artists from the Flemish city of Oudenaarde, and was at any rate from the Southern Netherlands. The first written record of his name comes from the city of Tournai, where he entered the guild of painters in 1434 with the title of master and described as an illuminator. In 1440 he took on an apprentice.

During much of his life he was employed by the court of Burgundy; the first known was a commission from Philip the Good to provide decorations in preparations for the Feast of the Pheasant in Lille in 1454, together with Jean Hennecart. Later in the same year, he is registered as living in Oudenaarde, and was paid by Philip the Good for a series of illustrations for a book of hours and a book about the crusader Godfrey of Bouillon. In 1441–1442 he was in Ghent. Archival mentions of an artist in Bruges 1450–1480 may refer to him, but it is uncertain.

Le Tavernier was throughout his life frequently commissioned by Philip the Good and the Burgundian court. Art historian Friedrich Winkler was the first to provide a tentative list of manuscripts commissioned by the court and illustrated by Le Tavernier, works produced in the 1450s and 1460s. The manuscripts can be roughly divided into two quite distinct categories: illustrated chronicles and prayer books, and illustrated works of Jean Miélot.

== Style ==
Detail from a grisaille miniature by Le Tavernier, in a chronicle manuscript

Stylistically, Le Tavernier developed a distinct, personal style; art historian François Avril has described him as one of the most original Flemish artists from the period 1450-1460. He specialised in grisaille painting, a technique that he "brought to an unprecedented level of refinement", according to the Grove Encyclopedia of northern Renaissance. He developed the technique by inventing methods to depict for example trees and plants in a way that made up for the loss of colour, and by applying a nuanced range of grey tones. He also made use of the sheen of the underlying parchment in his miniatures.

Le Tavernier also made illustrations in colour, for example in a breviary made for Philip the Good and today preserved in the Royal Library of Belgium. He was influenced by panel painting from the 1430s and 1440s (Early Netherlandish painting), in particular in the composition of scenes, and in presenting several scenes from a narrative in a single image. His treatment of spatial depth appears to be influenced by Jan van Eyck. François Avril has described his style as "lively and witty", showing great confidence in the organisation of space, in the vibrancy of figures, and in the depiction of drapery.

== Sources cited ==
- Avril, François (1999). "Jean Le Tavernier : un nouveau livre d'heures". Revue de l'Art (in French) (126). Éditions Ophrys: 9–22.
- Campbell, Gordon, ed. (2009). The Grove encyclopedia of northern Renaissance art. Vol. 2. Oxford University Press. ISBN 978-0-19-533466-1.
- Hulin de Loo, Georges (1928). "La formation tournaisienne de l'enlumineur Johannes de Tavernier et l'influence de celui-ci sur la xylographie harlemoise de la fin du XVe siècle". Bulletins de l'Académie Royale de Belgique (in French): 43–53.
- Kren, Thomas; McKendrick, Scot, eds. (2003). Illuminating the Renaissance: The Triumph of Flemish Manuscript Painting in Europe. Los Angeles: Getty Publications. ISBN 0-89236-703-2.
- Winkler, Friedrich (1925). Die flämische Buchmalerei des XV. und XVI. Jahrhunderts (PDF) (in German). OL 22970435M.
