= Feast of the Pheasant =

Banquet by Philip III, Duke of Burgundy

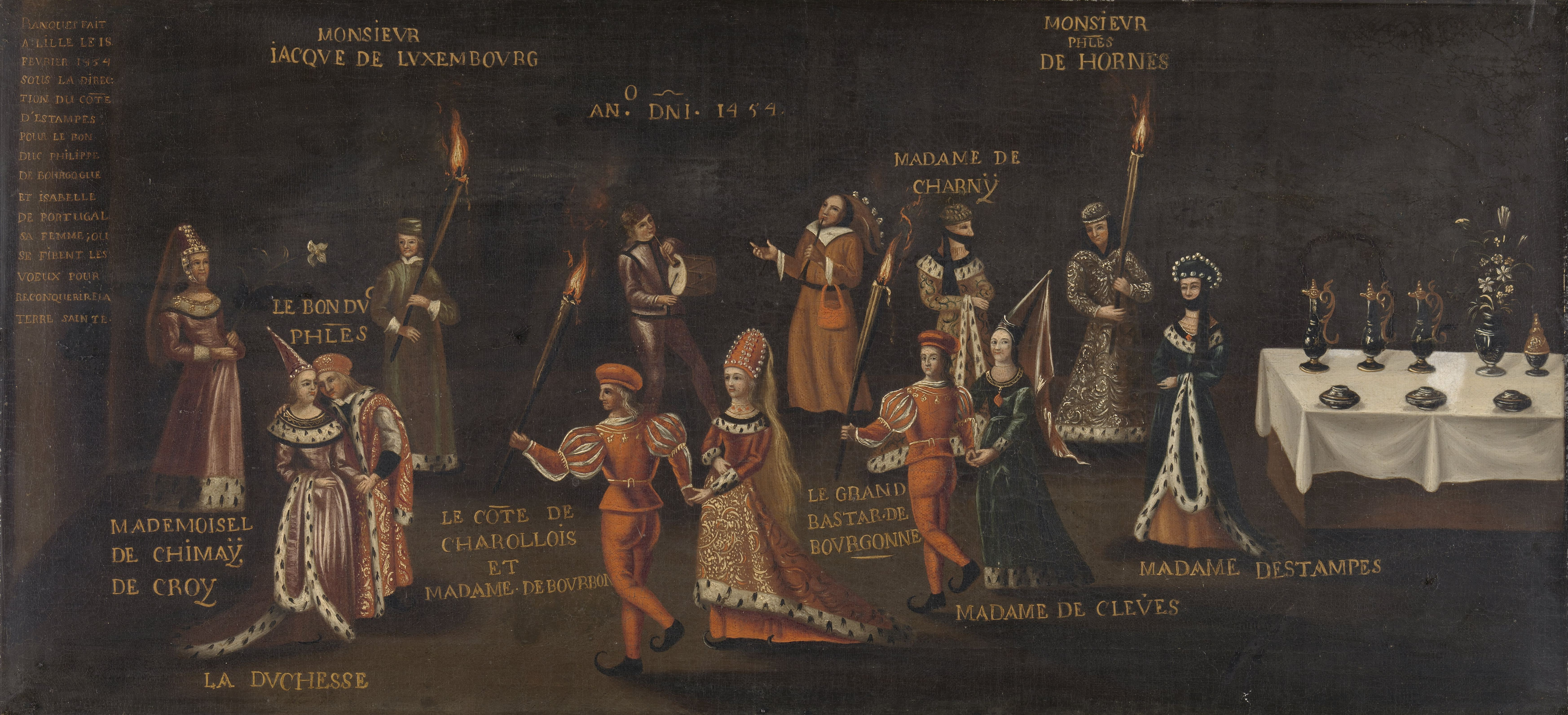
Anonymous sixteenth-century painting showing participants of the Feast of the Pheasant

The Feast of the Pheasant (French: Banquet du Vœu du faisan, lit. 'Banquet of the Oath of the Pheasant') was a banquet given by Philip the Good, Duke of Burgundy on 17 February 1454 in Lille, now in France. Its purpose was to promote a crusade against the Turks, who had taken Constantinople the year before. The crusade never took place.

There are contemporary accounts of the banquet (notably the Memoirs of Olivier de la Marche, and the Chroniques of Mathieu d'Escouchy), which name and describe in much detail the lavish entertainments staged during the meal and even the various pieces of music performed, perhaps including Dufay's motet Lamentatio sanctae matris ecclesiae Constantinopolitanae. At one point in the entertainment, according to the chronicles, an actor dressed as a woman in white satin clothes, personifying the Church of Constantinople (according to one hypothesis, played by Olivier de la Marche himself) entered the hall of the banquet riding on an elephant, led by a giant Saracen, to recite a "complaint and lamentation in a piteous and feminine voice" ("commença sa complainte et lamentacion à voix piteuse et femmenine"), requesting aid from the Knights of the Golden Fleece. It has been surmised that this was the moment when Dufay's motet would have been performed; other authors have conjectured that it was merely a moment of inspiration and that the motet was actually written later.

Also recounted is which music by Gilles Binchois was performed, that 24 musicians played inside an enormous pie, and a trick with a horse riding backwards. The court painters Jean Hennecart and Jean Le Tavernier were paid a large sum of money for having worked for twelve days on the decorations in preparation of the feast.

The oath taken by the participants, the Vœux du faisan (lit. 'oath of the pheasant') was in the tradition of the "bird oaths" of late medieval France, as popularized in the 14th century romance of the Voeux du paon.

== See also ==
- List of dining events
