= François Avril =

French art historian and librarian (born 1938)

- Born: 19 August 1938 (age 88)
- Education: École Nationale des Chartes
- Occupations: Art historian; librarian
- Writing career
- Notable awards: CNRS Silver Medal (1989)

François Avril (born 19 August 1938) is a French art historian and librarian, specialising in medieval manuscripts and illuminations.

== Early life and education ==
Avril graduated from the École Nationale des Chartes in 1963 with a thesis entitled La décoration des manuscrits dans les abbayes bénédictines de Normandie aux XI-XII siecles (Manuscript Decoration in Benedictine Abbeys in Normandy in the 11th to 12th centuries). The same year, he was made palaeographic archivist and a member of the French Academy in Rome.

== Career ==
He joined the manuscripts department at the Bibliothèque nationale de France in 1967 and remained there until retirement in 2003 as general curator.

=== Recognition ===
In 1989, the French National Centre for Scientific Research (CNRS) awarded Avril a silver medal. In 2004, he was granted an honorary doctorate from the Free University of Berlin. As part of the award, he gave a day of lectures which were then published in a volume called Mélanges.

== Selected works ==
- Avril, François (1964). "Notes sur quelques manuscrits bénédictins normands du XIe et du XIIe siècle". Mélanges d'archéologie et d'histoire (in French). 76 (2): 491–525.
- Avril, François (1965). "Notes sur quelques manuscrits bénédictins normands du XIe et du XIIe siècle (suite)". Mélanges d'archéologie et d'histoire (in French). 77 (1): 209–248.
- Avril, François (1978). L'enluminure à la cour de France au XIVe siècle (in French). Paris: Chêne. ISBN 978-2-85108-165-0.
- Avril, François (1984). Dix siècles d'enluminure italienne: VIe–XVIe siècles (in French). Paris: Bibliothèque nationale de France. ISBN 2-7177-1690-4.
- Avril, François (1986). Le Livre des Tournois du Roi René de la Bibliothèque Nationale (ms. français 2695) (in French). Paris: Herscher. ISBN 2-7335-0129-1.
- Avril, François; Reynaud, Nicole (1993). Les manuscrits à peintures en France: 1440–1520 (in French). Paris: Flammarion / Bibliothèque nationale de France. ISBN 2-08-012176-6.
- Avril, François (2003). Jean Fouquet: peintre et enlumineur du XVe siècle (in French). Paris: Bibliothèque nationale de France / Hazan. ISBN 2-7177-2257-2.
- Avril, François; Reynaud, Nicole; Cordellier, Dominique (2011). Les Enluminures du Louvre, Moyen Âge et Renaissance (in French). Paris: Hazan / Louvre éditions. ISBN 978-2-7541-0569-9.
