= Shrine of Saint Servatius =

The shrine during the 2025 Pilgrimage of the Relics

The shrine during the 1976 Pilgrimage of the Relics

The Shrine of Saint Servatius (Dutch: Servatiusschrijn, more commonly known as Noodkist, literally 'Chest of Distress') is a shrine and reliquary in the Basilica of Saint Servatius in Maastricht, Netherlands. Made in the second half of the 12th century, it is one of the major surviving works of Mosan Romanesque metalwork. The shrine contains relics traditionally attributed to Saint Servatius and Saint Martin of Tongeren. Its oak core is covered with gilded copper and decorated with relief sculpture, enamel, filigree, gemstones and other materials. Four related gabled reliquaries, now in the Royal Museums of Art and History in Brussels, are associated with the shrine. The precise chronology, original arrangement and interpretation of some of the figures remain subjects of art-historical debate.

== History ==
The shrine was made in Maastricht during the second half of the 12th century for the relics of Saint Servatius, the late Roman bishop traditionally associated with Tongeren and Maastricht. Its exact date is uncertain. Renate Kroos, whose 1985 monograph is the principal scholarly study devoted to the shrine and its associated reliquaries, proposed a later chronology than the c. 1160–1170 date generally given in earlier scholarship. Fred Ahsmann, in his broader study of the medieval choir of Saint Servatius, argued for a date around 1167.

The commission belongs to a period of major building and artistic activity at Saint Servatius. During the 12th century the college chapter of Saint Servatius was an influential ecclesiastical institution, and several of its provosts, including Gerhard von Are and Christian von Buch, were connected with high-ranking ecclesiastical and imperial circles. The shrine was probably commissioned as part of the renewal of the church and its choir. The role of Rainald von Dassel, archbishop of Cologne and a figure associated with the Maastricht chapter, has also been considered in discussions of its patronage.

The shrine formed part of a larger ensemble in the medieval choir. Its relationship to an altar, the four Brussels reliquaries and a now largely lost programme of wall and vault paintings has become an important subject of modern scholarship. Ahsmann in particular has attempted to reconstruct the medieval choir as an integrated architectural and iconographic programme.

The shrine became an important object of the cult of Saint Servatius and was carried in processions during times of crisis. The name Noodkist (‘Chest of Distress’) is first recorded in 1405; the practice of carrying the shrine in procession in times of crisis is first documented in 1409.

The shrine and four associated gabled reliquaries reunited at the 1972 Rhine and Meuse exhibition

Four associated gabled reliquaries were separated from the shrine in the 19th century. In 1846 they were sold by the parish dean, Paulus Antonius van Baer, possibly through intermediaries, to the Russian prince and art collector Pyotr Saltykov. After the sale of Saltykov's collection in 1861, the reliquaries were acquired by the Royal Museums of Art and History in Brussels, now the Art & History Museum. The shrine and the four reliquaries were reunited for the exhibition Rhine and Meuse: Art and Culture 800–1400 in Brussels and Cologne in 1972.

During the 1980s and early 1990s, scholarly interest in the shrine and the church treasury increased, resulting in several important publications, including Renate Kroos's monograph on the shrine (1985), A. M. Koldeweij's study of the Servatiana (1985), and Annemarie Stauffer's study of the medieval textiles (1991). From 1982, the shrine and copies of the Brussels reliquaries were displayed in the treasury in the so-called Double Chapel. During the COVID-19 pandemic, the church authorities decided that the shrine should return to the church rather than remain in a museum-like setting. In November 2020, the ensemble was moved to the north transept, where the shrine is displayed in a secure glass case on a purpose-built pedestal incorporating cases for the reliquary copies and accompanying information panels.

== Description ==
=== Techniques ===
The two gabled sides of the shrine: Christ (left) and Saint Servatius with two angels (right)

The apostle figures on the side traditionally called the "Paul side"

The shrine is an approximately 175 cm long oak chest with a gabled roof, clad on the exterior with gilded copper. Its architectural form has been interpreted as an image of a heavenly dwelling or "house of heaven".

The copper plates were worked using repoussé and chasing, while the larger figures are cast in bronze as high reliefs. The reliefs were supported by a modelling or filling material. Other techniques include stamped ornament, filigree, pointillé, champlevé enamel and vernis brun. The decoration incorporates rock crystal, cabochons, gemstones, antique gems and a late Roman cameo.

Differences in the execution of the reliefs and in the quality of the brown varnish indicate the participation of at least two craftsmen. The identities of the principal goldsmiths are unknown.

=== Iconography ===
The principal subject of the iconographic programme is the Last Judgment. On the two short sides are representations of Christ and Saint Servatius. Christ appears as Majestas Domini, while Saint Servatius is shown as a bishop accompanied by two angels.

The two long sides contain the Twelve Apostles, six on each side, seated in pairs beneath double arcades. The figures are identified by inscriptions and, with the exception of some figures, hold scrolls bearing biblical texts. The apostles form part of the larger eschatological programme of the shrine.

Detail of the roof showing the condemned at the Last Judgment

The roof develops the theme of the Last Judgment. On the side conventionally called Misericordia, the elect are shown in three medallions. They include clergy, religious and lay people and are associated with the seven works of mercy described in Matthew 25 ("The Sheep and the Goats"). Angels sound trumpets, distribute heavenly garments to the righteous and present them with crowns.

The opposite side, conventionally called Veritas, shows the damned. The scenes correspond to those of the elect but introduce the negation of the works of mercy. The angels weigh the deeds of the condemned and remove their heavenly garments. The inscriptions on the roof, together with those on the apostles' scrolls, reinforce the connection with the Last Judgment.

The inscriptions on the shrine are integral to its iconographic programme. Several derive from the New Testament, particularly Matthew 25, and connect the actions of the depicted figures with judgement, resurrection and the distribution of reward and punishment.

=== Contents ===
The shrine contains relics traditionally attributed to Saint Servatius and Saint Martin of Tongeren. Historical inspections recorded bones, ashes and textiles accompanied by labels identifying their supposed provenance.

A fragment of a femur attributed to Martin was subjected to radiocarbon dating in 1963. The result indicated with 95 percent confidence that the individual had lived in the fifth or sixth century, making the attribution to Martin uncertain. The other bones have not, as far as is known, been scientifically dated.

Six textile fragments associated with the shrine have also been studied. Several date from the 10th or 11th centuries, while the oldest is a Byzantine silk dated to the seventh or eighth century. None of the identified textiles therefore dates from the lifetime traditionally assigned to Servatius.

== Associated gabled reliquaries in Brussels ==
Four gabled reliquaries associated with the shrine are preserved in the Royal Museums of Art and History in Brussels. They are slightly smaller than the gables of the shrine, measuring approximately 56 by 33 cm. Made of gilded copper, they employ techniques comparable to those of the shrine, including repoussé and casting, champlevé enamel and brown varnish.

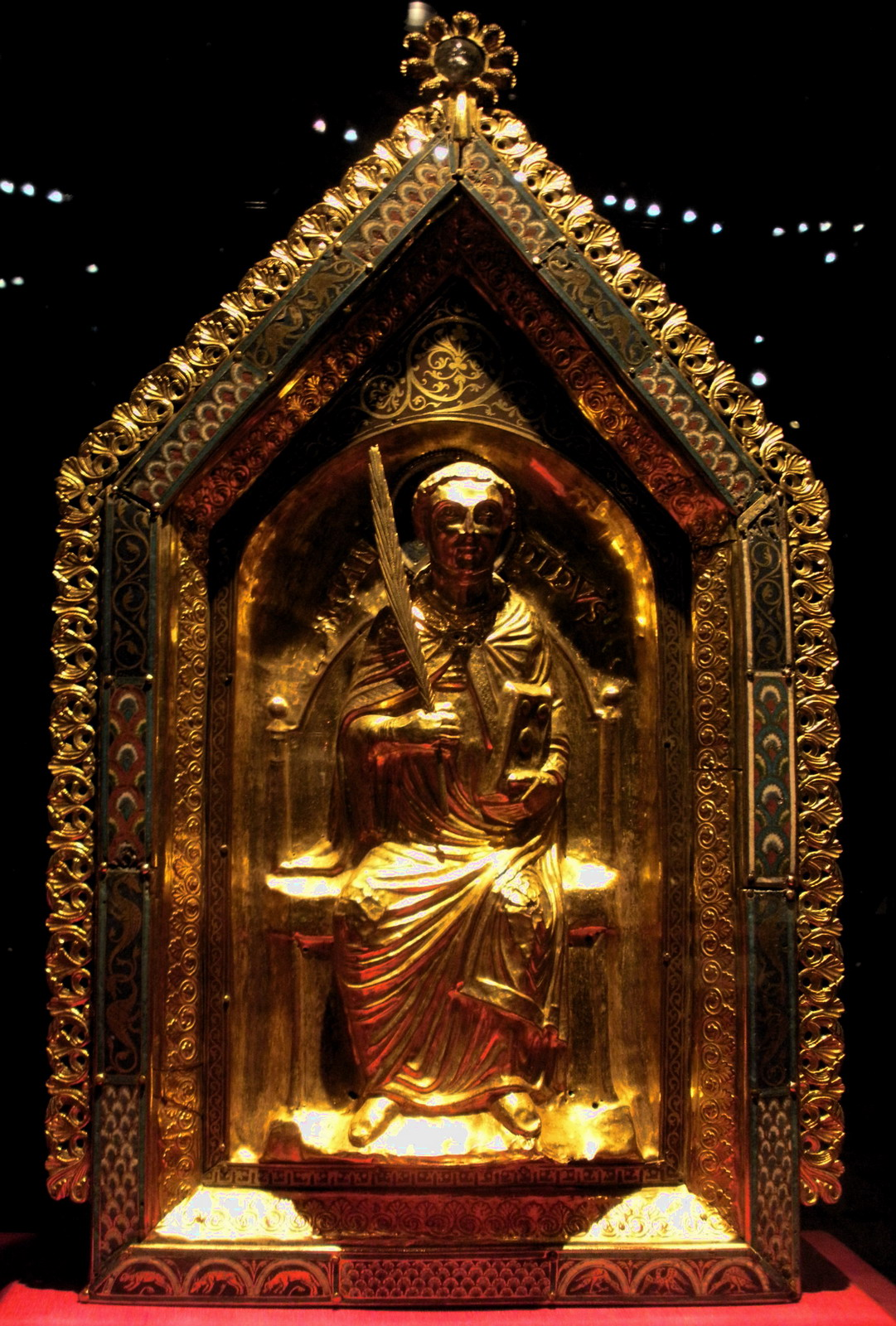
Three of the four Brussels reliquaries (B, C, D)

The four panels are conventionally designated A, B, C and D. They formerly contained relics attributed to the bishops Monulph, Gondulph, Candidus and Valentine. The relics were removed before the panels were sold in 1846.

Panels A and B are closely similar. Each shows a bishop emerging or looking upwards from an arched niche while angels present him with a heavenly crown. The traditional interpretation, adopted by Kroos and by the Brussels museum, identifies the figures as the Maastricht bishops Saint Monulph and Saint Gondulph.

An alternative interpretation was developed by Aart Mekking and Fred Ahsmann. They identify the figures on A and B as donor portraits of the 12th-century archbishops Christian von Buch and Rainald von Dassel. Their interpretation is based in part on the absence of halos, the inscriptions associated with the figures and the proposed function of the panels within the original choir programme.

The original arrangement of the four reliquaries is uncertain. Kroos regarded the four panels as closely related elements of the ensemble, while Ahsmann argues that C and D may be remnants of older liturgical objects that were associated with the Servatius shrine only later. Ahsmann's reconstruction therefore places only A and B in the principal 12th-century arrangement with the shrine.

== Art-historical analyses ==
Left: work by the Master of Paul (apostles, Shrine of Saint Heribert). Right: work by the Master of Peter (kings, Karlsschrein).

The Shrine of Saint Servatius (left) and the Shrine of Saint Domitian (right). Compare the figures on the short and long sides, and the medallions on the roof. Note also the eight-lobed floral motif on both shrines.

The shrine and its associated Brussels reliquaries are major examples of Mosan art and have been compared with a number of 12th-century reliquaries and other works of Mosan metalwork. Among the principal comparisons discussed by Kroos and others are the Karlsschrein in Aachen Cathedral, the shrines of Heribert at Cologne-Deutz, Hadelin at Visé, Domitian and Mengold at Huy, works from Stavelot Abbey, the surviving gables of the shrine of Saint Ode of Amay, now in the British Museum and the Walters Art Museum, and the reliquary of the arm of Charlemagne in the Louvre.

Hermann Schnitzler, who studied the shrine extensively, distinguished two principal artistic hands, conventionally called the "Master of Paul" and "Master of Peter". He associated the more dynamic apostles, particularly Paul, Bartholomew, John and James the Greater, with the former, while the latter was characterised by more linear treatment of drapery, known in German as the Rillenfaltenstil ("ribbed-fold style").

Peter Lasko, Joseph Timmers and Dietrich Kötzsche subsequently modified aspects of Schnitzler's analysis. Lasko pointed to overlaps between the two styles; Timmers distinguished a third artistic hand in addition to Schnitzler's two masters; and Kötzsche compared the shrine with other Mosan works, particularly those associated with Huy and Stavelot.

Renate Kroos questioned the use of the Rillenfaltenstil as a chronological criterion and emphasised instead the coherent architectural design of the shrine. In particular, she noted the relationship between its symmetrical double arcades and the medallions of the roof. She also regarded the quality of the brown varnish as particularly high and compared the ornamental crest with those of the reliquaries from Huy.

Fred Ahsmann placed the shrine and two of the Brussels reliquaries within a reconstruction of the 12th-century choir of Saint Servatius. In his interpretation, the reliquaries formed part of a larger programme that included the lost wall and vault paintings of the choir. His identification of panels A and B as portraits of contemporary patrons gives the reliquaries a different function from that proposed in the traditional interpretation.

The precise chronology, workshop organisation, original arrangement and identification of some of the figures therefore remain unresolved. The surviving shrine and associated reliquaries nevertheless provide important evidence for the development of Romanesque metalwork in the Meuse valley and for the sophisticated theological and artistic programmes associated with major ecclesiastical institutions in the 12th century.

== See also ==
- Bust of Saint Servatius
- Karlsschrein (Aachen)
- Shrine of Saint Heribert (Cologne-Deutz)
- Shrine of Saint Hadelin (Visé)
- Shrine of Saint Domitian (Huy)
- Shrine of Saint Mengold (Huy)
- Shrine of Saint Ode (Amay, London and Baltimore)
