= Bust of Saint Servatius =

Reliquary in Maastricht, the Netherlands

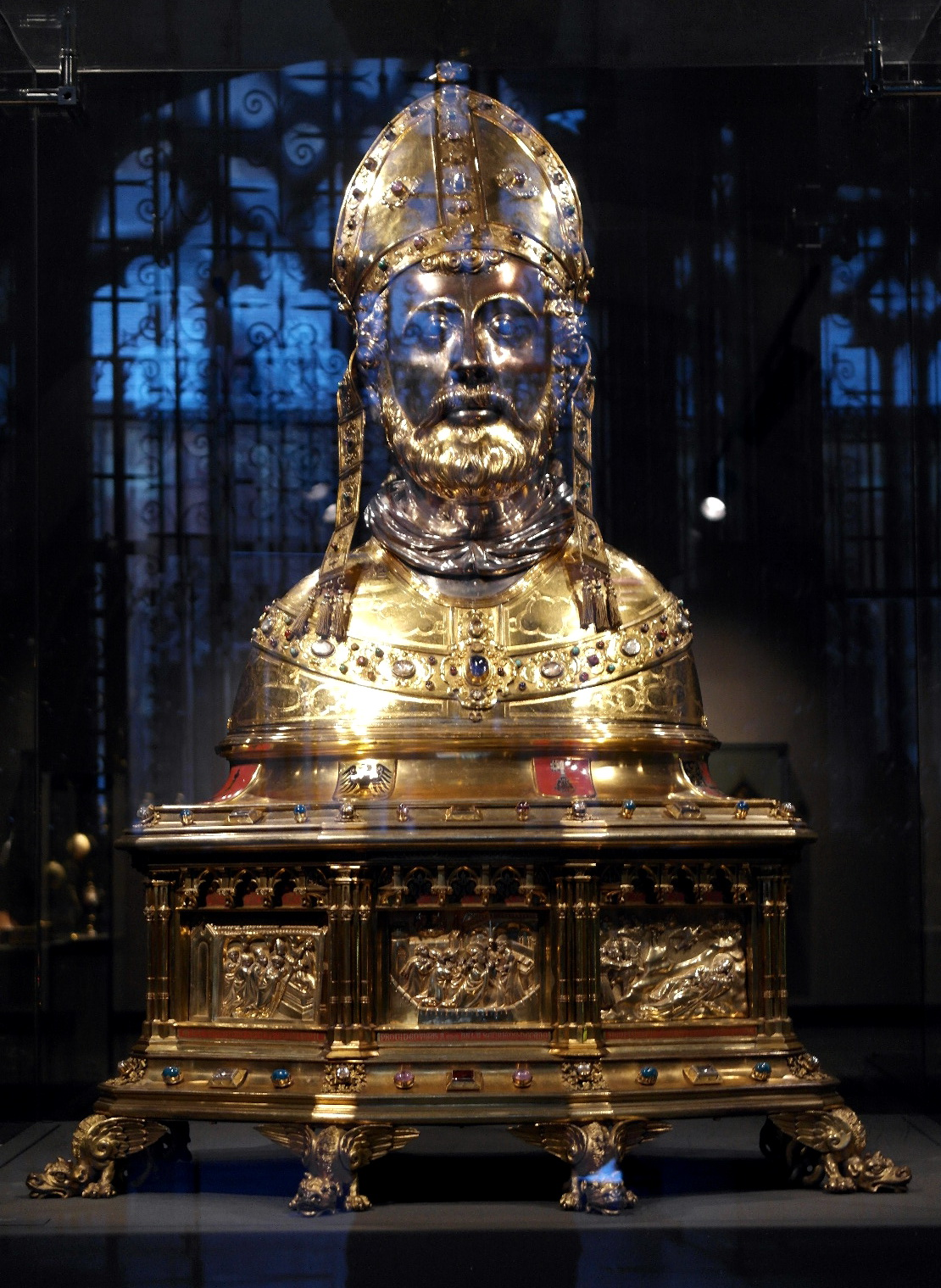
The reliquary bust displayed prominently in the treasury, 2016

The Bust of Saint Servatius, also known as the Reliquary bust of Saint Servatius or the Servatius bust, is a portrait bust dating mainly from the sixteenth century that serves as a reliquary for a fragment of the skull of Saint Servatius. Made of gilded and silvered copper and set with gemstones, it is housed in the Treasury of the Basilica of Saint Servatius in Maastricht, the Netherlands.

The present bust incorporates surviving parts of an earlier reliquary bust dating from around 1400, which was largely destroyed during the sack of Maastricht in 1579. Parts of the original base are held by the Museum für Kunst und Gewerbe Hamburg. The present base dates from the early twentieth century.

== History ==
The relics of Saint Servatius, traditionally regarded as a fourth- or fifth-century bishop of Tongeren and Maastricht, were kept in Maastricht from an early date. In the sixth century, Gregory of Tours reported that Bishop Monulph had placed the saint's remains beneath the altar of a church he built. In 1039, the relics were reportedly transferred to a stone coffin near the high altar of the new Church of Saint Servatius; in the twelfth century, the chapter placed them in an elaborate reliquary chest made of gilded copper known as the Noodkist. The saint's skull had apparently been kept separately: a skull reliquary is mentioned in the tenth century, and a reliquary bust of Saint Servatius was recorded at the Imperial Palace of Goslar around 1050. Neither object survives, and it is uncertain whether these early reliquaries took the form of a bust.

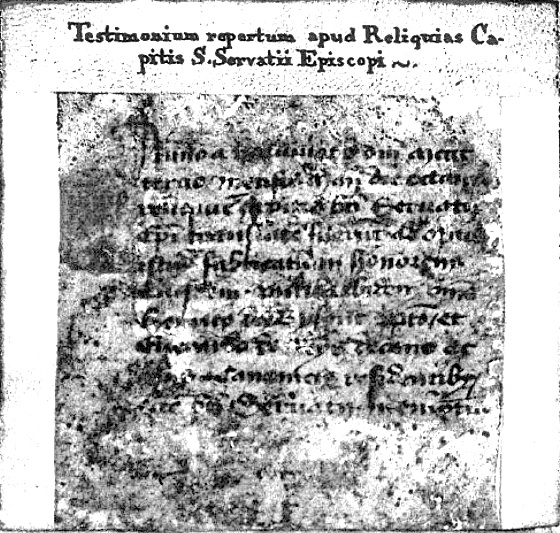
The cedula recording the transfer of the skull relic on 8 May 1403 (Note: The Latin text of the cedula reads: "Anno a Nativitate Domini MCCCC tercio, mensis Maii die octava, reliquie presentis capitis beati Servatii Episcopi translate fuerunt ad opus istud fabricatum in honorem Eiusdem, presentibus ibidem dominis Henrico a Bylant preposito / et Everardo de R[M]eys decano ac aliis Canonicis residentibus ecclesie beati Servatii memorati" (In the year of the Nativity of Our Lord 1403, on the eighth day of the month of May, the relics of the head of Saint Servatius, the blessed bishop, were transferred to this object, made in his honour, in the presence of the aforementioned lords Henry of Byland, provost, and Everard de R[M]eys, dean, and the other resident canons of the aforementioned church of Saint Servatius.))

In 1403, a fragment of Saint Servatius's skull was transferred to a specially made silver reliquary bust, as recorded in a contemporary cedula (relic authentication document). The bust belonged to a regional tradition of prestigious reliquary busts, including those of Charlemagne in Aachen (Karlsbüste), Pope Cornelius at Kornelimünster Abbey, and John the Baptist at Burtscheid Abbey. It may have been connected with a donation by the Bavarian duke Henry XVI, who was said to have recovered from gout after seeing Saint Servatius's breast cross. The bust may have been intended to display the cross around its neck. In the fifteenth and sixteenth centuries, it was shown to pilgrims, including during the Pilgrimage of the Relics of Maastricht, and was associated with a chapel known as the King's Chapel.

The bust was probably destroyed during the siege and sack of Maastricht in 1579, when Spanish Habsburg troops under Alexander Farnese, Duke of Parma captured the city. Shortly afterwards, surviving parts of the original were incorporated into a replacement, largely remade around 1580 at the duke's expense. Parts of the head were restored, while the shoulders and episcopal mitre were renewed and Parma's coat of arms was added to the back. The replacement was carried in procession by 1587. The surviving remains of the original bust include parts of the head incorporated into the present object and eight gilded silver plaques depicting scenes from the saint's life. (Note: It is possible that the original base survived intact or in part. In a 1677 inventory of the church treasure, it was suggested that the base then in use was the original one, made in 1403.) The plaques, formerly part of the base, are now held by the Museum für Kunst und Gewerbe in Hamburg (Inventory number 1885.1195). The museum acquired the gilded silver plaques in Antwerp in 1885 using funds from the bequest of Johann Jacob David Neddermann (d. 1883). The import marks on the plaques are identified as Belgian import marks used between 1831 and 1869. Kroos considered them relevant to determining when the plaques left Maastricht.

The bust continued to be used in religious ceremonies, although public processions and displays became more restricted after Maastricht was captured by Frederick Henry, Prince of Orange in 1632. It largely survived the major losses suffered by the church treasury following the French capture of Maastricht in 1794 and the suppression of the chapter in 1797. (Note: Bock and Willemsen mention in 1872, following Martinus van Heylerhoff, a base made in the early eighteenth century by a Maastricht silversmith named Weery. The silversmith may have been Fredericus Wery (1656–1727). This base was presumably lost during the French period.) Around 1908, the Aachen goldsmith's workshop August Witte GmbH restored the bust and made a new base into which copies of the eight plaques now held in Hamburg were inserted. (Note: Koldeweij (1985b, 2000), Van Os (2000), and Ahsmann (2017) name the Aachen goldsmith August Witte as the maker of the base. This cannot refer to the company's founder, August Witte (1840–1883), who had died before the base was made. His sons Bernhard Witte (1868–1947) and August Witte Jr. (1875–1908) continued the business under the name August Witte GmbH. Kroos refers only to the “Aachen goldsmith Witte”, but identifies him as “B. Witte” in the name and subject index. This points to Bernhard Witte as a possible maker, although the attribution cannot be considered conclusive.) In 2023, the bust was removed for conservation and examination of the skull relic. It returned to the treasury in 2024, in a renewed display case, and resumed its place in the annual Saint Servatius procession.

== Art historical description ==
The Bust of Saint Servatius is a gilded and silvered copper portrait bust depicting Saint Servatius of Maastricht and Tongeren. It consists of four parts: the mitre, the skull cap containing the relic, the bust itself (head and shoulders), and a later-added base.

=== Bust and mitre ===
The bust is made of repoussé and chased copper. The exposed skin is silvered, while the clothing, hair, moustache, beard and eyebrows are gilded. Both finishes are heavily worn in places. The pupils are made of blue and black enamel. The top of the saint's head is truncated almost horizontally where it joins the gilded copper mitre. Beneath the mitre is a separate skull cap made of gilded silver, with a round glass aperture through which the skull relic can be seen.

When the bust was opened around 1670, a cedula (certificate of authenticity) was found inside. Written on parchment, it records the transfer of the skull fragment to the bust on 8 May 1403. The cedula was removed in the nineteenth century and is now kept separately in the treasury. The silver skull cap may survive from the original bust of 1403, although this attribution is uncertain.

The mitre and the shoulder section, which bears a pallium, are decorated with engraved bands set with gemstones. The coat of arms of the Duke of Parma appears on the back. The bust, including the mitre but excluding the base, is 65.6 cm high and 51 cm wide.

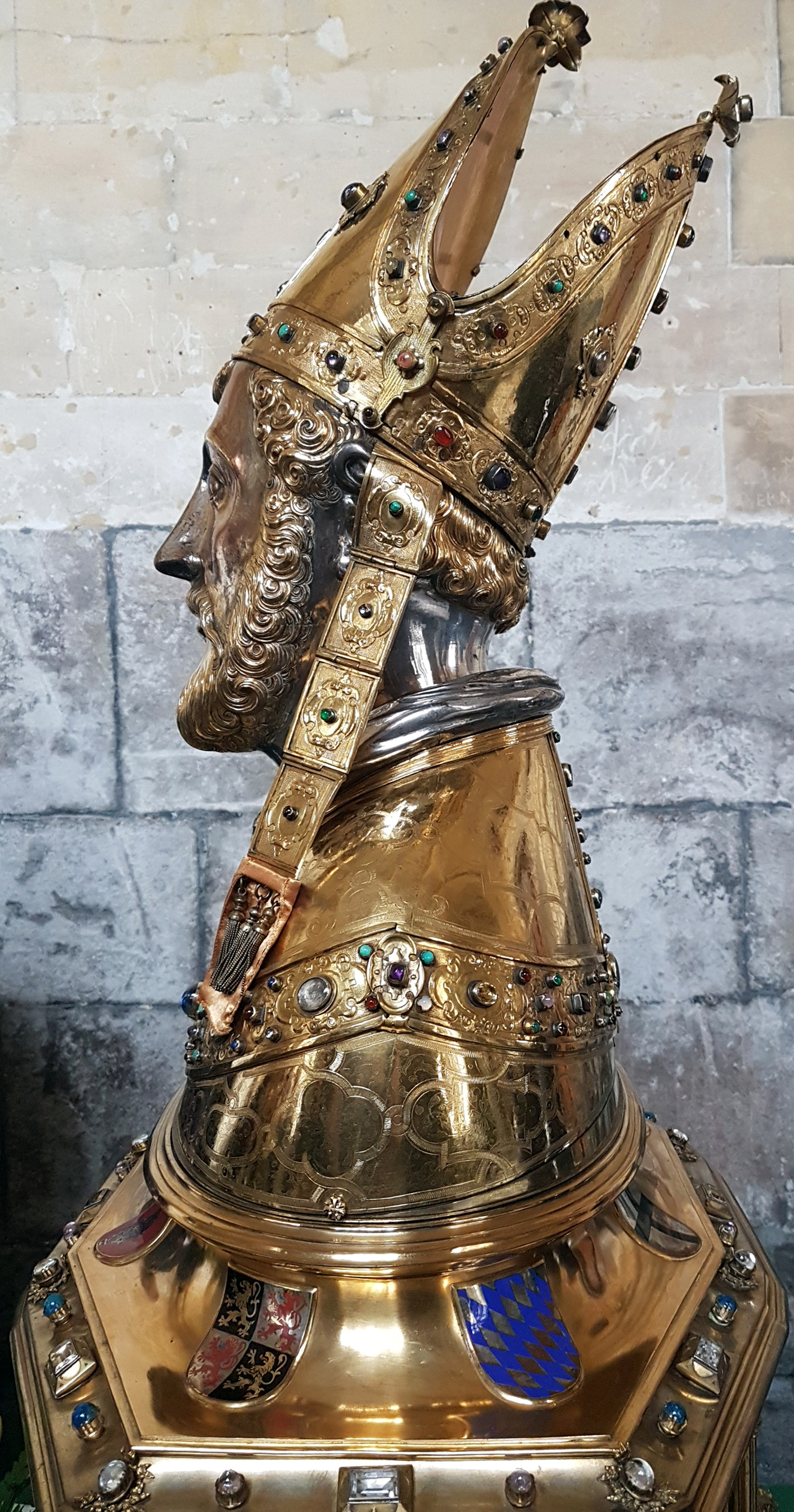
Side view

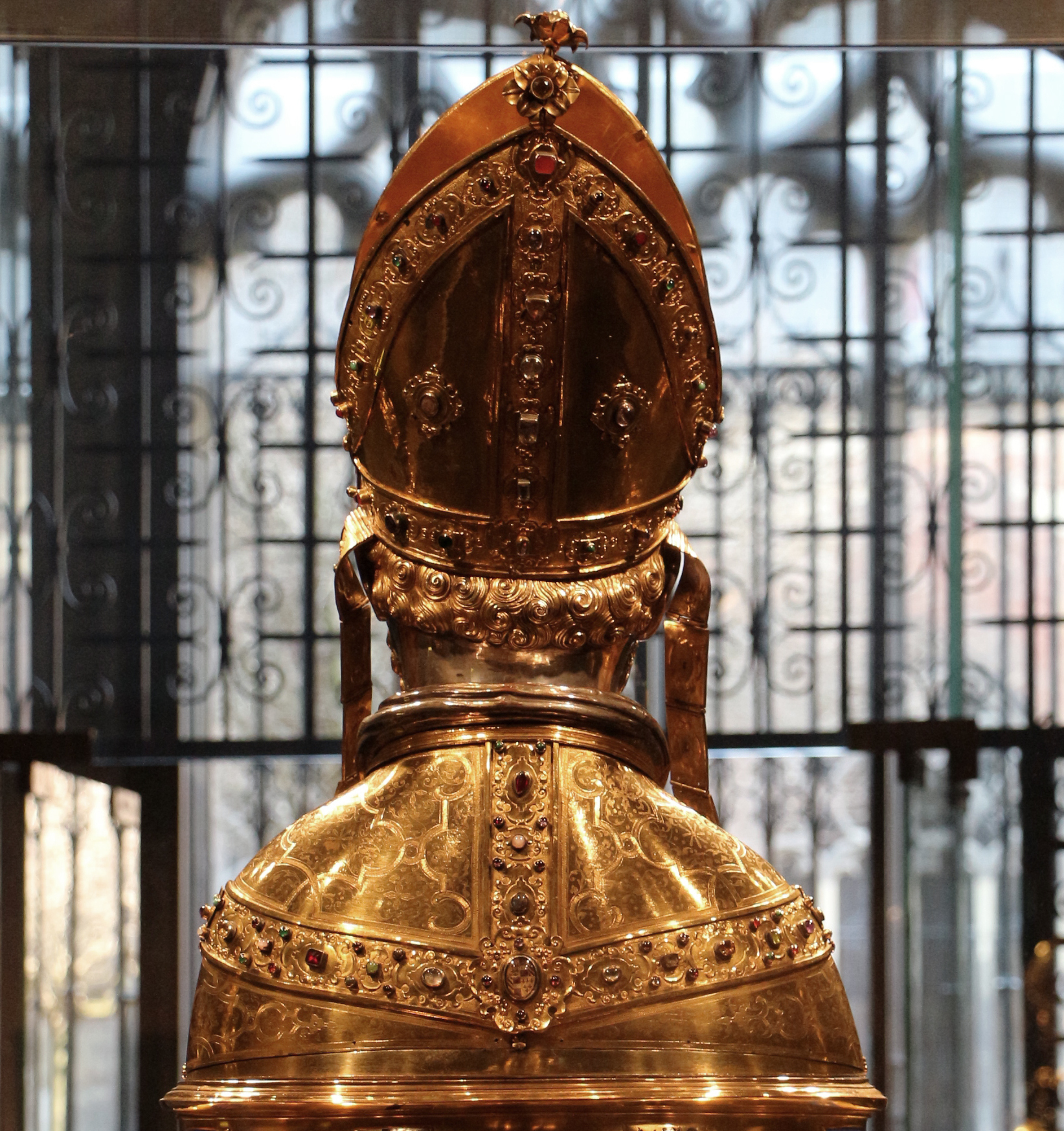
Rear view

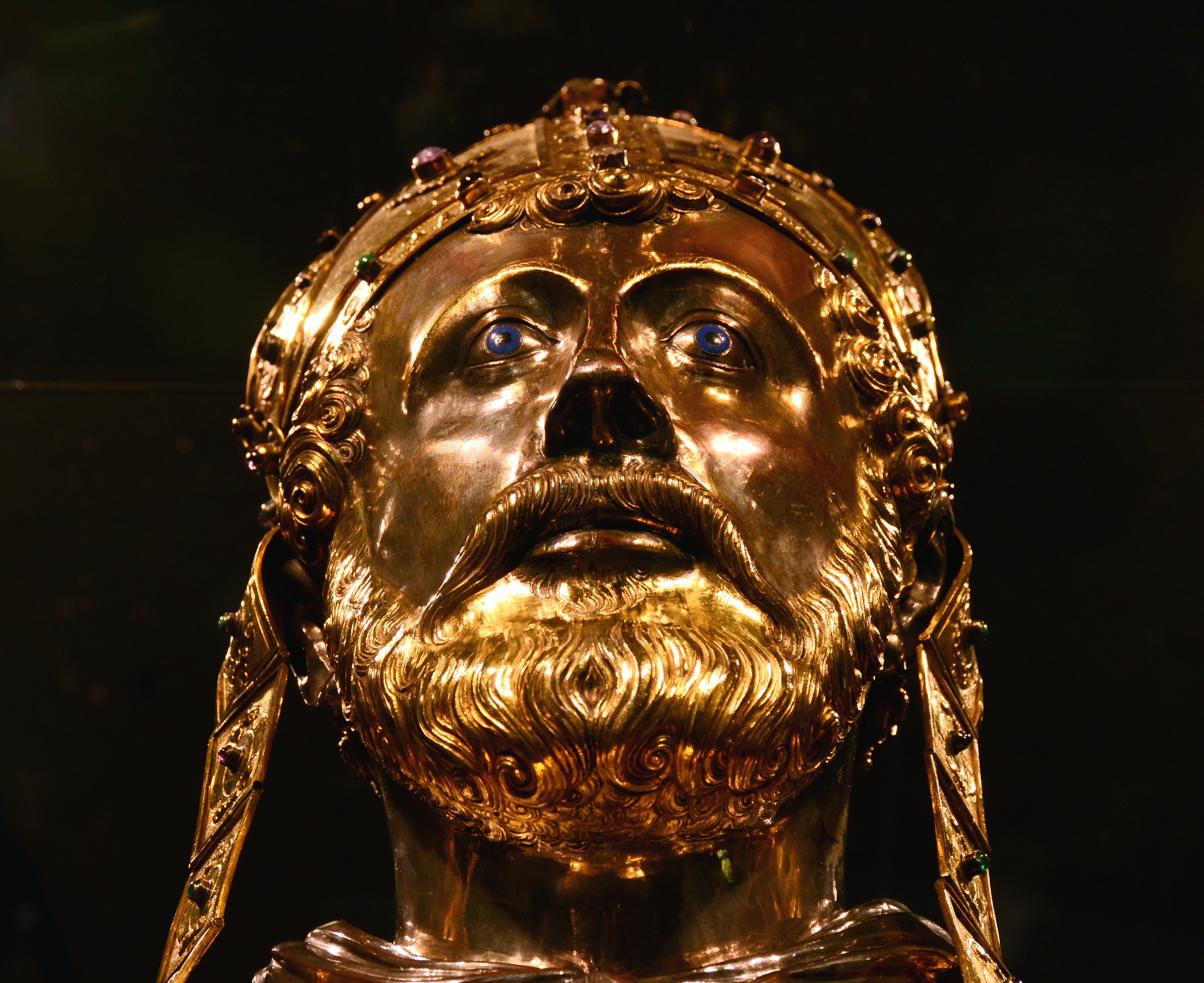
Detail of the face

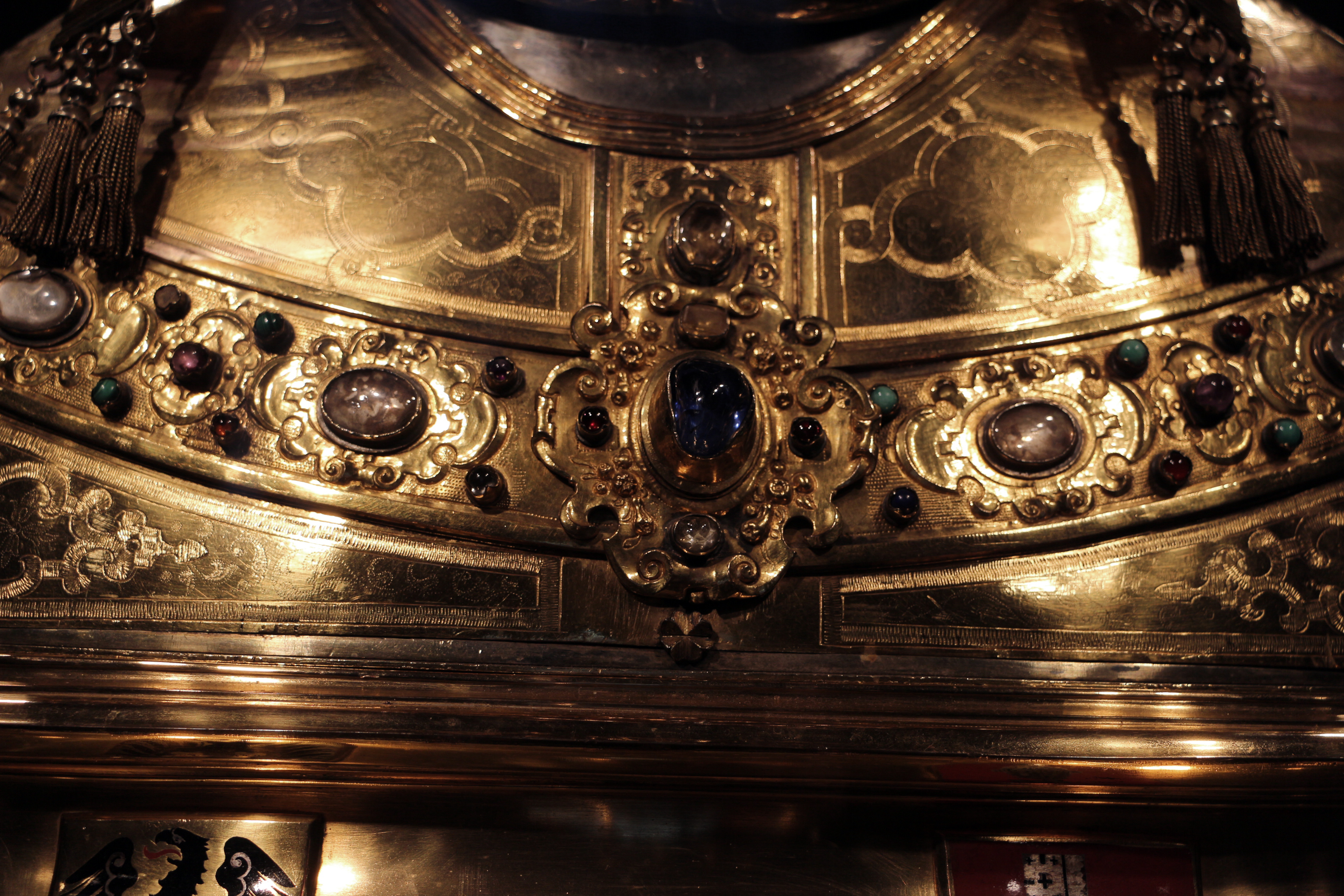
Detail of the pallium

=== Base and plaques ===
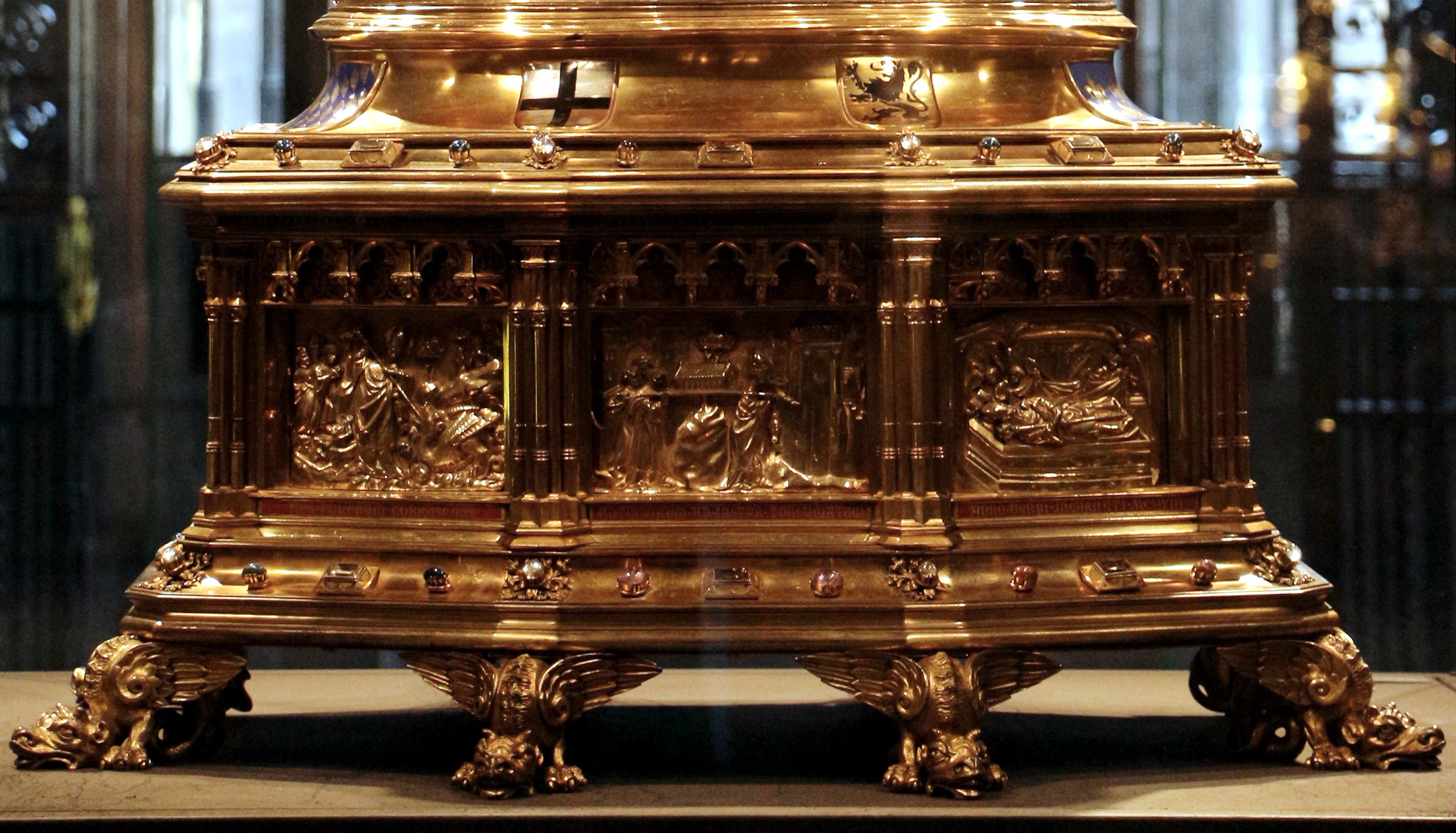
Rear view of the base

The 35 cm-high Gothic Revival base was made in 1908 by the Aachen workshop August Witte GmbH. It is made of silvered copper decorated with enamel and gemstones and rests on eight feet in the form of winged dragons. A Latin inscription along the lower edge commemorates its creation, while eight small coats of arms along the upper edge represent individuals and institutions believed to have played a role in the bust's history.

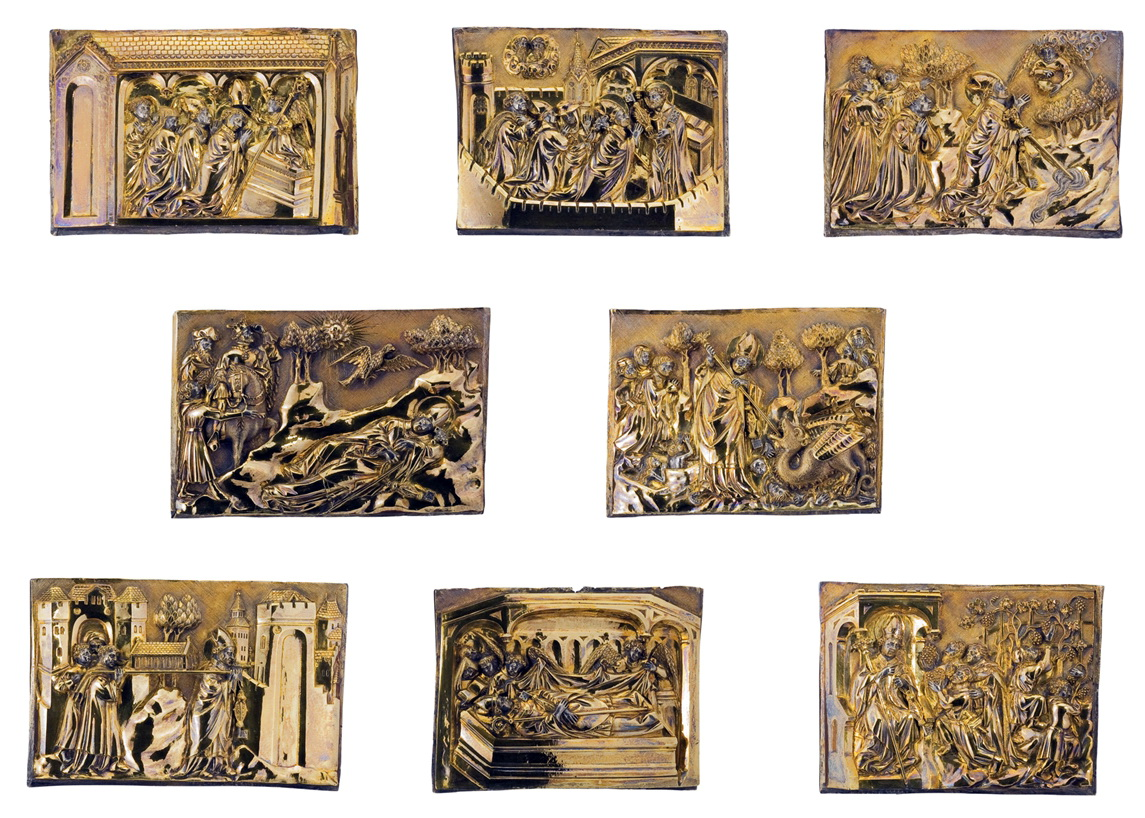
The original silver plaques, c. 1400

The Liège art historian and painter Jules Helbig published the first study of the eight gilded silver plaques in 1890, shortly after the Museum für Kunst und Gewerbe Hamburg had acquired them. He suggested that they were made by a local artist, noting the accurate depiction of objects associated with Saint Servatius, including his pilgrim's staff and the Key of Saint Servatius. He also compared the plaques with the woodcuts in the Blockbook of Saint Servatius, held by the Royal Library of Belgium in Brussels. The blockbook, which depicts scenes from the saint's legend, is now dated to around 1460, more than half a century after the plaques were made. The iconography of Saint Servatius, however, appears to have been established by around 1400 and changed little in subsequent centuries.

The plaques depict eight scenes from the legend of Saint Servatius:

1. An angel presents Saint Servatius with a bishop's staff and mitre.
2. Saint Servatius receives the key to Heaven from Saint Peter.
3. Servatius kills a dragon with his pilgrim's staff.
4. Servatius causes a spring to emerge with his staff and receives a drinking vessel from an angel.
5. An eagle protects Servatius from the scorching sun.
6. Servatius leaves Tongeren and transfers the relics of his predecessors to Maastricht.
7. Servatius dies in Maastricht.
8. Servatius punishes several grape thieves.

The original plaques in Hamburg are made of silver and are gilded except for the figures' hands and faces. Each measures 13.8 × 10.7 cm and is approximately 2.5 cm thick. In 1908, Witte incorporated copper-gilt copies into the new base.

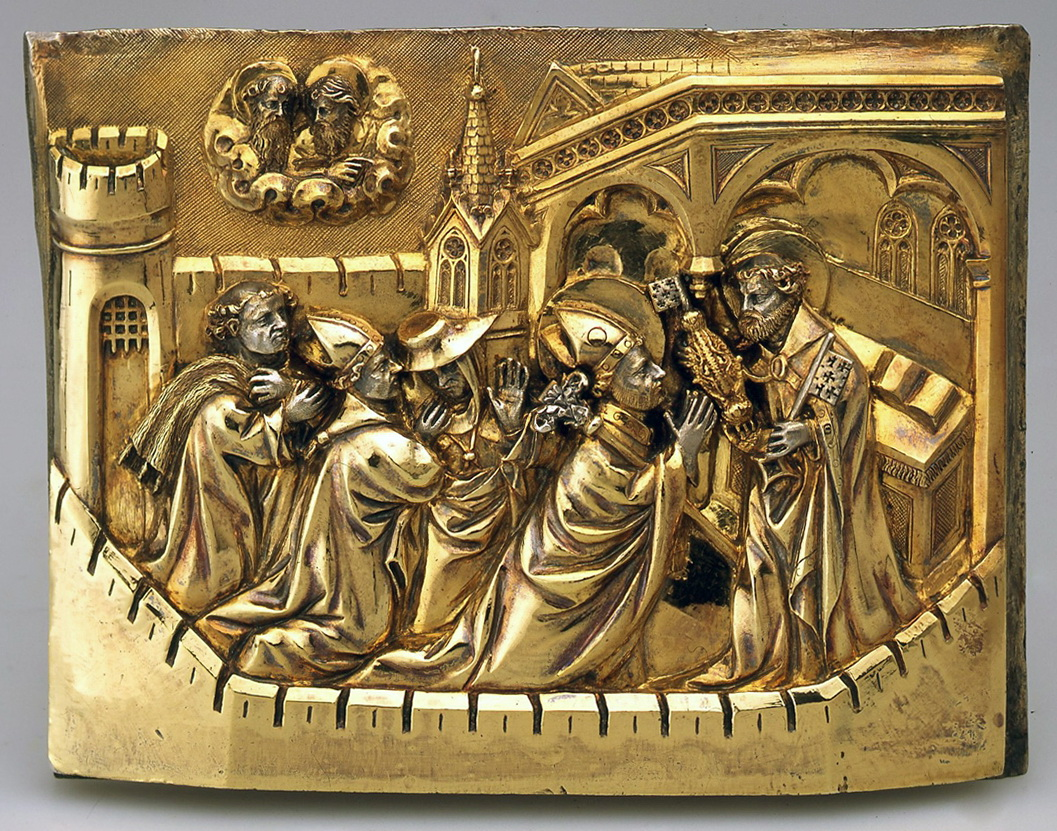
Original plaque in Hamburg: scene 2

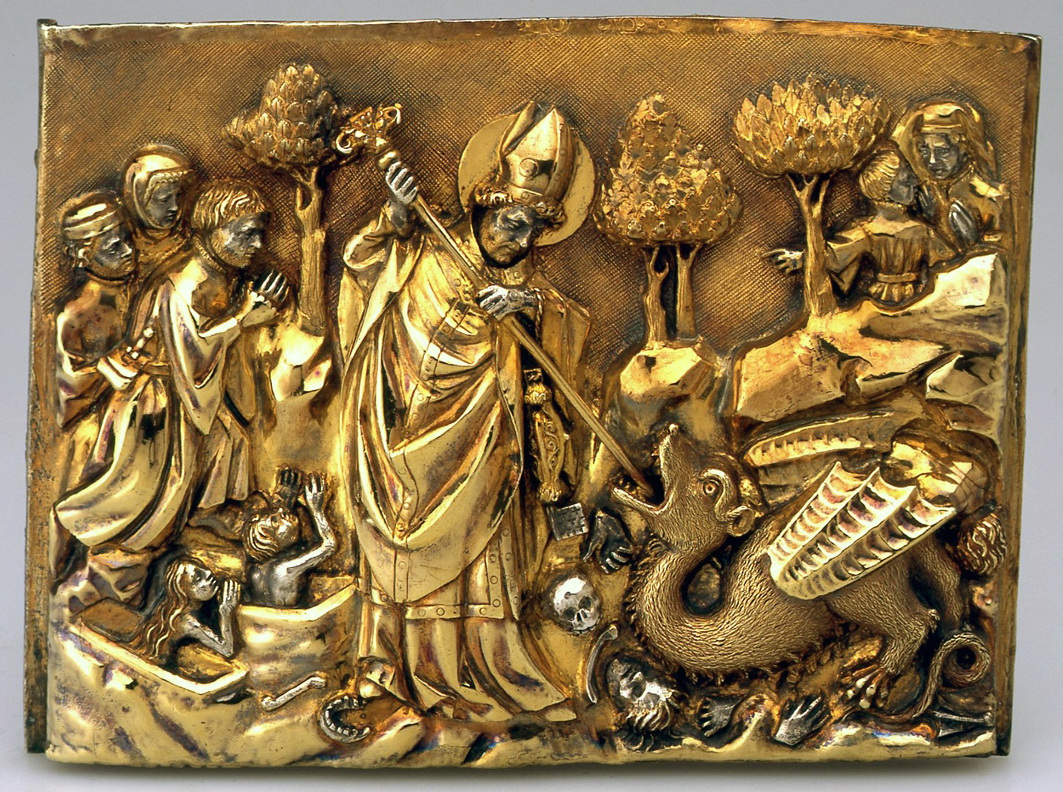
Original plaque in Hamburg: scene 3

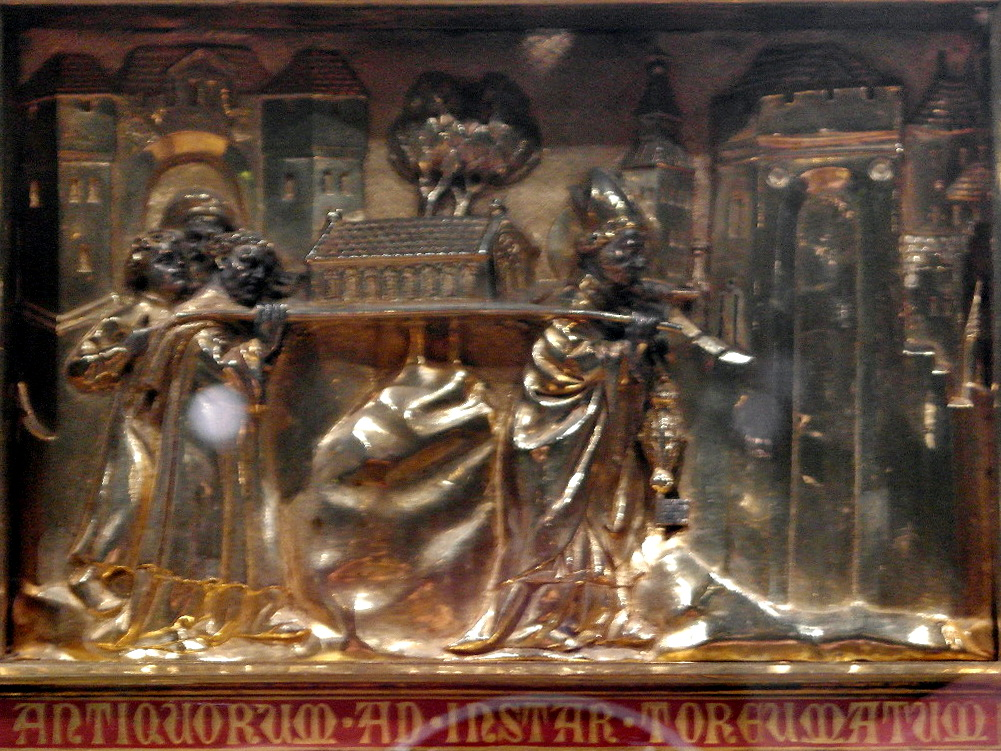
Copy in the Maastricht base: scene 6

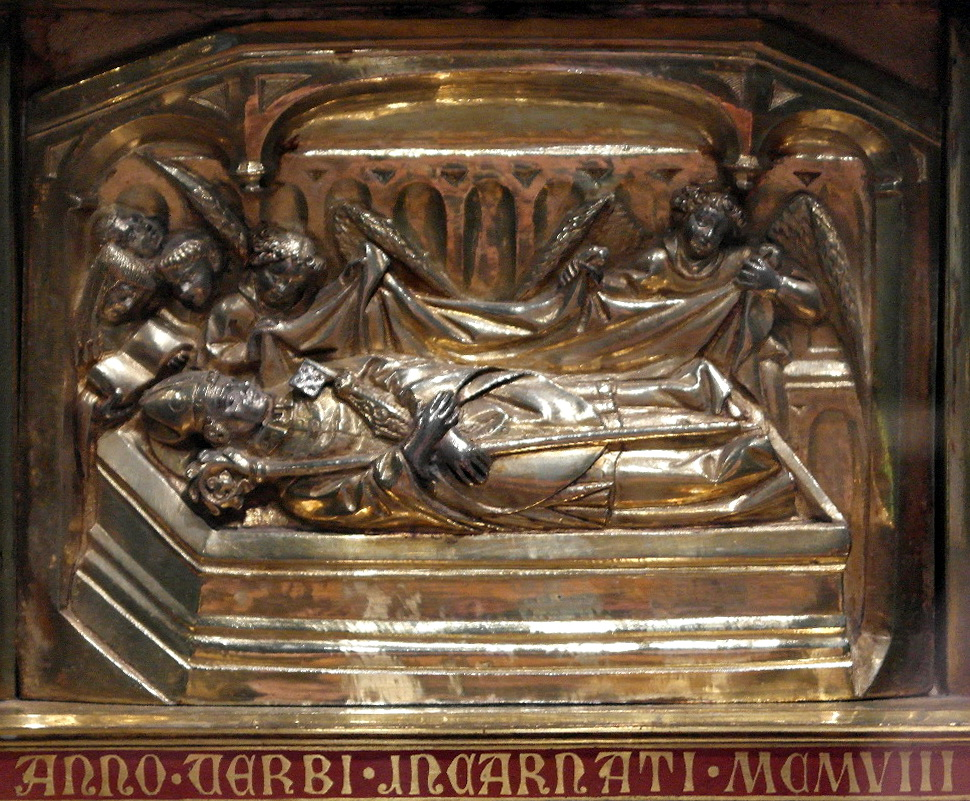
Copy in the Maastricht base: scene 7

== Religious and symbolic significance ==
As a reliquary containing a first-class relic of Saint Servatius, the bust ranked alongside the Noodkist, the shrine containing the saint's other principal relics, and above the Servatiana, relics of the second or third class. Its earliest documented liturgical use was in the procession around the Vrijthof on the Feast of the Triumph of Saint Servatius. For pilgrims, a highlight was the removal of the mitre to reveal a fragment of the saint's skull. During the medieval pilgrimages of the relics of Maastricht, the bust was among the objects displayed to the public on the Vrijthof.

Today, the bust is one of Maastricht's four principal objects of civic devotion (stadsdevoties), alongside the statue of Our Lady, Star of the Sea, the Black Christ of Wyck, and the bust of Saint Lambert. It takes part in the annual procession on Saint Servatius's feast day (13 May) and, during the seven-yearly Pilgrimage of the Relics, is displayed in the basilica's choir. In processions, it follows the other objects of civic devotion and precedes the Noodkist. When not in use for religious ceremonies, it is displayed near the entrance to the treasury.

In the twentieth century, the bust was carried in processions by the Brothers of Maastricht. In 1976, at the initiative of Brother Sigismund Tagage, the Saint Servatius Guild was founded to take over this role. Today, guild members carry the bust on a processional bier during religious ceremonies and outdoor processions.

The bust is an emblem of the Basilica of Saint Servatius, the Pilgrimage of the Relics and the city of Maastricht. It appears on pilgrim badges, posters, flags, banners and other printed materials, as well as on devotional candles.

The bust in procession, 1990

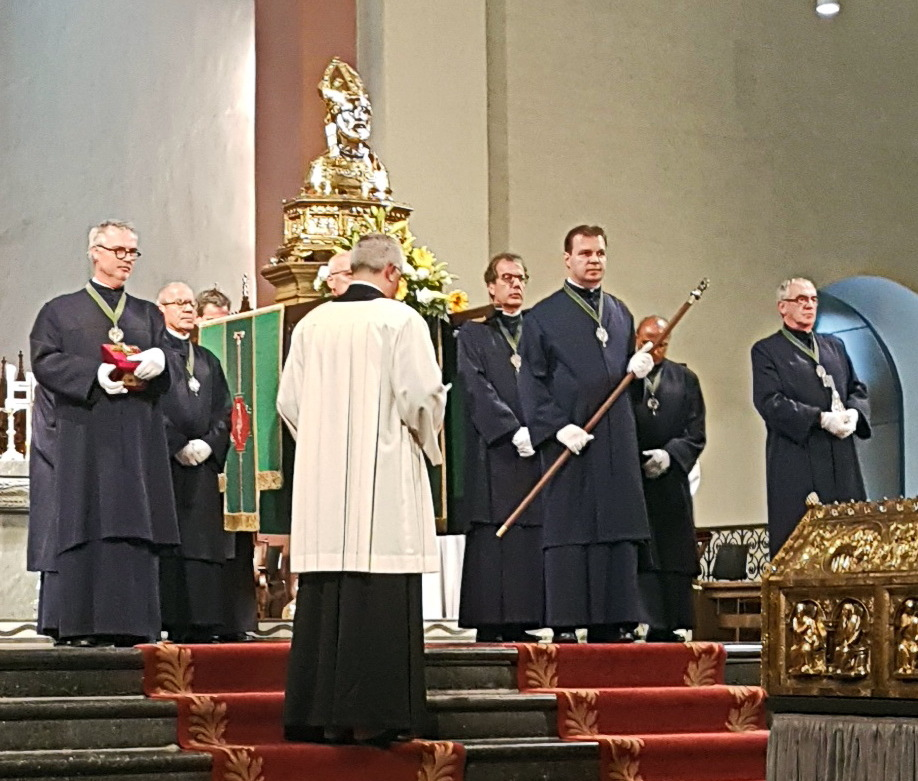
The bust in the display of the relics, 2018

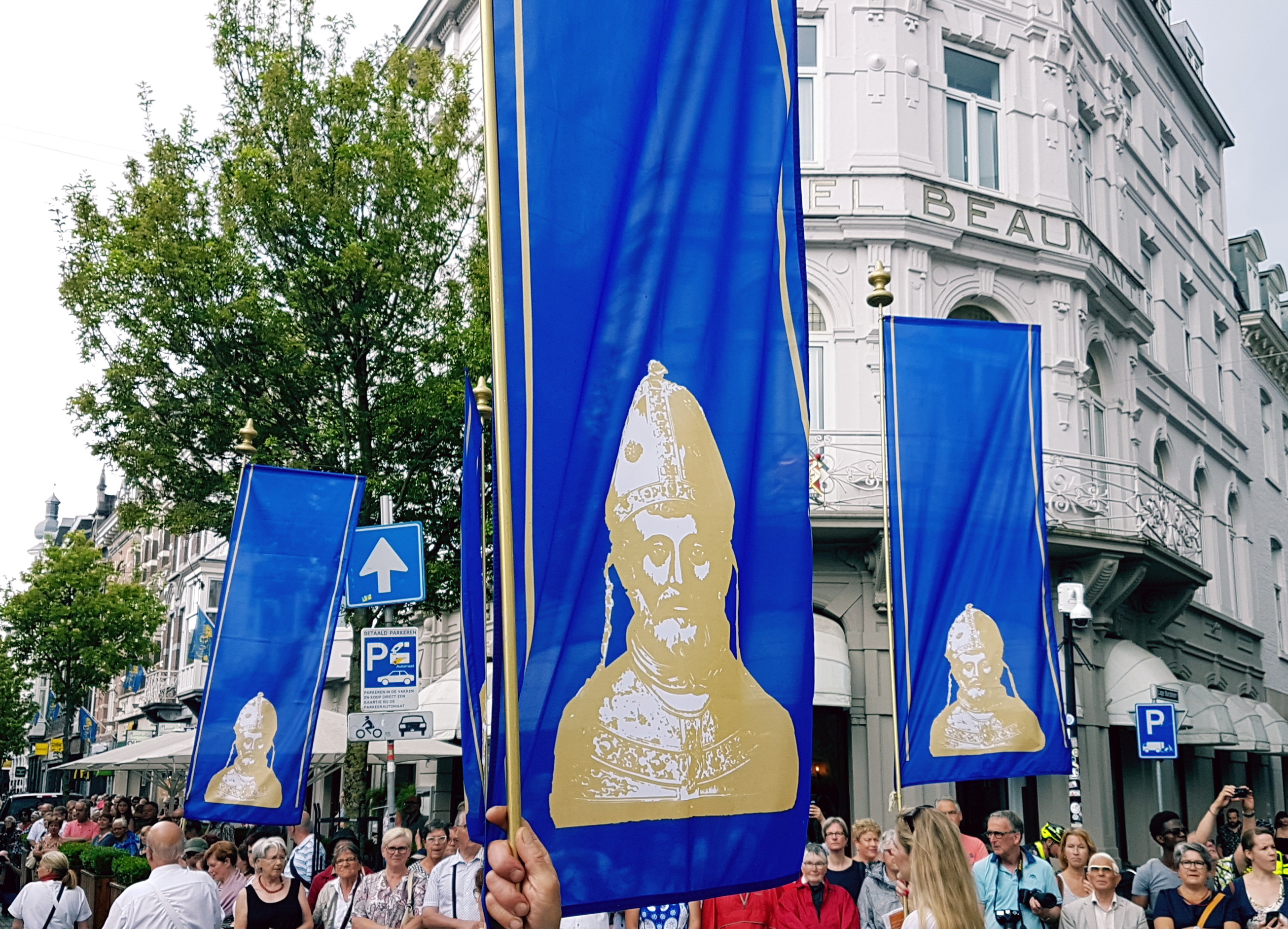
Flags featuring the bust during the Pilgrimage of the Relics, 2018

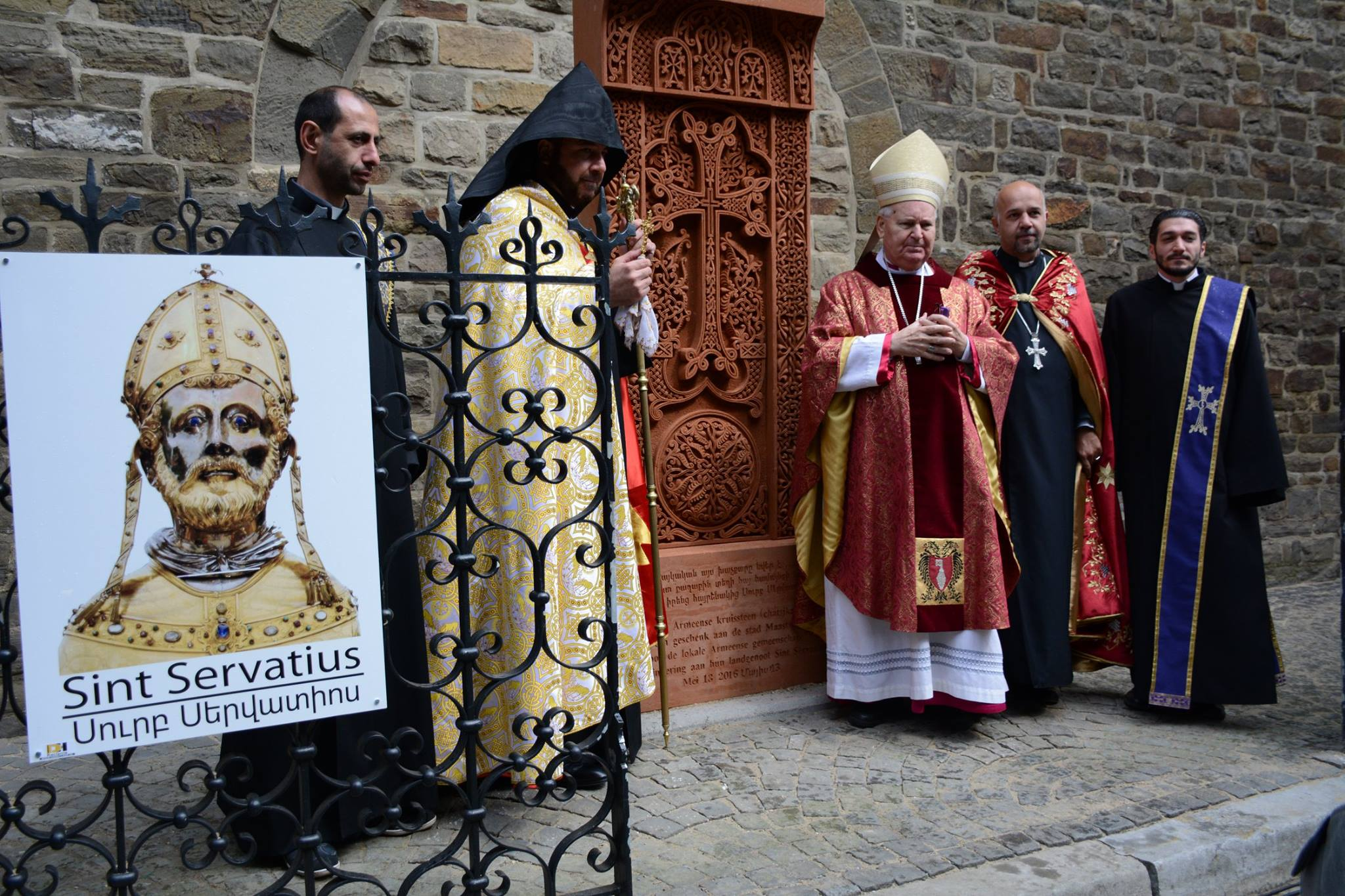
Poster featuring the bust at the inauguration of a khachkar, 2016

== See also ==
- Treasury of the Basilica of Saint Servatius
- Shrine of Saint Servatius
- Key of Saint Servatius
- Bust of Charlemagne

== Bibliography ==
- (English, Dutch) Ahsmann, Fred (2017). Order and Confusion. The Twelfth-Century Choir of the St. Servatius Church in Maastricht. Clavis Kunsthistorische Monografieën, vol. XXIV. Clavis Stichting Middeleeuwse Kunst, Utrecht. Appendix in Dutch available online (separately paginated).
- (German, French, Dutch) Bock, Franz, and Michaël Willemsen (1872/1873/1874). Die mittelalterlichen Kunst- und Reliquienschätze zu Maestricht, aufbewahrt in den ehemaligen Stiftskirchen des h. Servatius und Unserer Lieben Frau daselbst, usw. / Antiquités sacrées conservées dans les anciennes collégiales de S. Servais et de Notre-Dame à Maestricht, etc. / Het heiligdom van St. Servaas-kerk te Maastricht. Trilingual bound edition. Maastricht / Cologne and Neuss. German edition online; French edition online.
- (French) Helbig, Jules (1890). La sculpture et les arts plastiques au pays de Liège et sur les bords de la Meuse. Société de Saint-Augustin / Desclée, Debrouwer & Cie., Bruges. Online text.
- (Dutch) Koldeweij, A. M. (1985a). Der gude Sente Servas. Maaslandse Monografieën, vol. 5. Van Gorcum, Assen and Maastricht. ISBN 90-232-2119-2. Online text.
- (Dutch) Koldeweij, A. M. (1985b). "Het borstbeeld van Sint Servatius". In: Koldeweij and Van Vlijmen (eds.), Schatkamers uit het Zuiden, pp. 138–140. Rijksmuseum Het Catharijneconvent, Utrecht. ISBN 90-71240-02-9.
- (German) Koldeweij, A. M. (2000). "Das Servatius-Büstenreliquiar in der Maastrichter Servatiuskirche und seine liturgische Nutzung". In: Kunst und Liturgie im Mittelalter: Akten des internationalen Kongresses der Bibliotheca Hertziana und des Nederlands Instituut te Rome, Rom, 28.–30. September 1997. Nicolas Bock, Munich. Online text.
- (German) Kroos, Renate (1985). Der Schrein des heiligen Servatius in Maastricht und die vier zugehörigen Reliquiare in Brüssel. Veröffentlichungen des Zentralinstituts für Kunstgeschichte in München, vol. VII. Deutscher Kunstverlag, Munich. ISBN 3-422-00772-5.
- (Dutch) Van Os, Henk (2000). De weg naar de Hemel. Reliekverering in de Middeleeuwen. Exhibition catalogue, Amsterdam and Utrecht. Uitgeverij De Prom, Baarn. ISBN 90-6801-732-2.
