= Martin of Tongeren =

Bishop of Tongeren

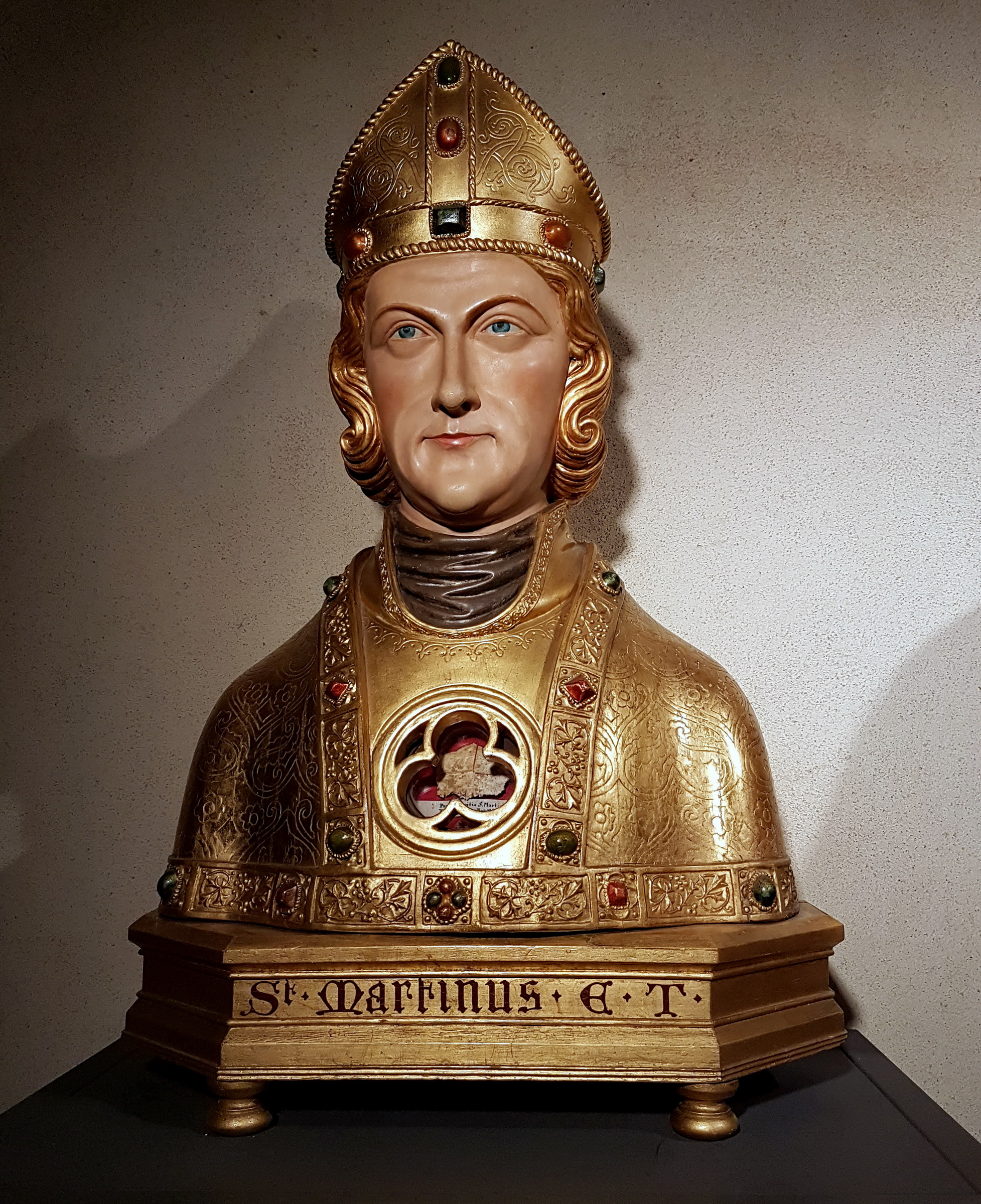
19th-century reliquary bust of Saint Martin of Tongeren in the Treasury of the Basilica of Saint Servatius in Maastricht, the Netherlands

Saint Martin of Tongeren (also known as Martin or Martinus of Tongres) (died c. 350) is venerated as the seventh bishop of Tongeren. He apostolized the Hesbaye district of Liège and Brabant. His feast day is June 21.
