= Treasury of the Basilica of Saint Servatius =

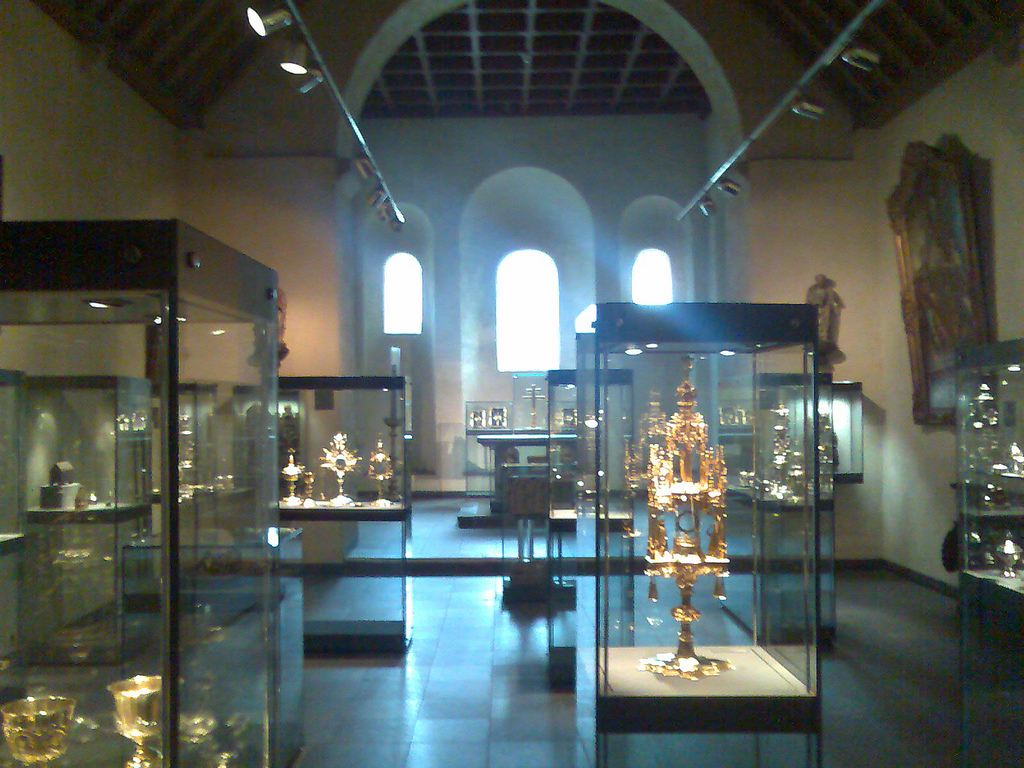
- Established: ±1070
- Location: Keizer Karelplein 6, Maastricht, Netherlands
- Coordinates: 50.848611°N 5.687222°E
- Director: Jacques van Rensch (treasurer)
- Website: www.sintservaas.nl

The Treasury of the Basilica of Saint Servatius is a museum of religious art and artifacts inside the Basilica of Saint Servatius in Maastricht, Netherlands.

== History ==
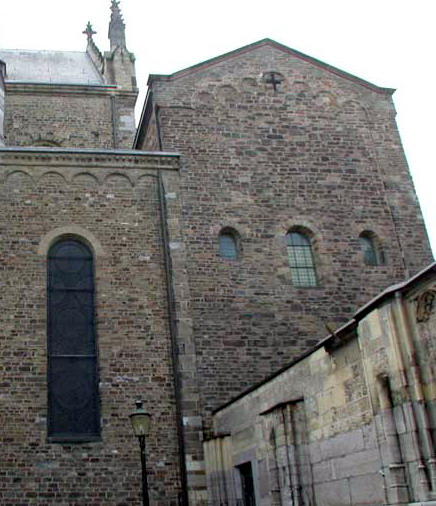
Exterior treasury chapel

The treasure of the church of Saint Servatius was put together over many centuries. One of the oldest pieces (today non-existent) was a reliquary in the shape of a triumphal arch, donated by Einhard (biographer of Charlemagne and abbot of Saint Servatius) in the 9th century. In the 11th century a custodian ('custos') was put in charge of the church's already sizable treasure.

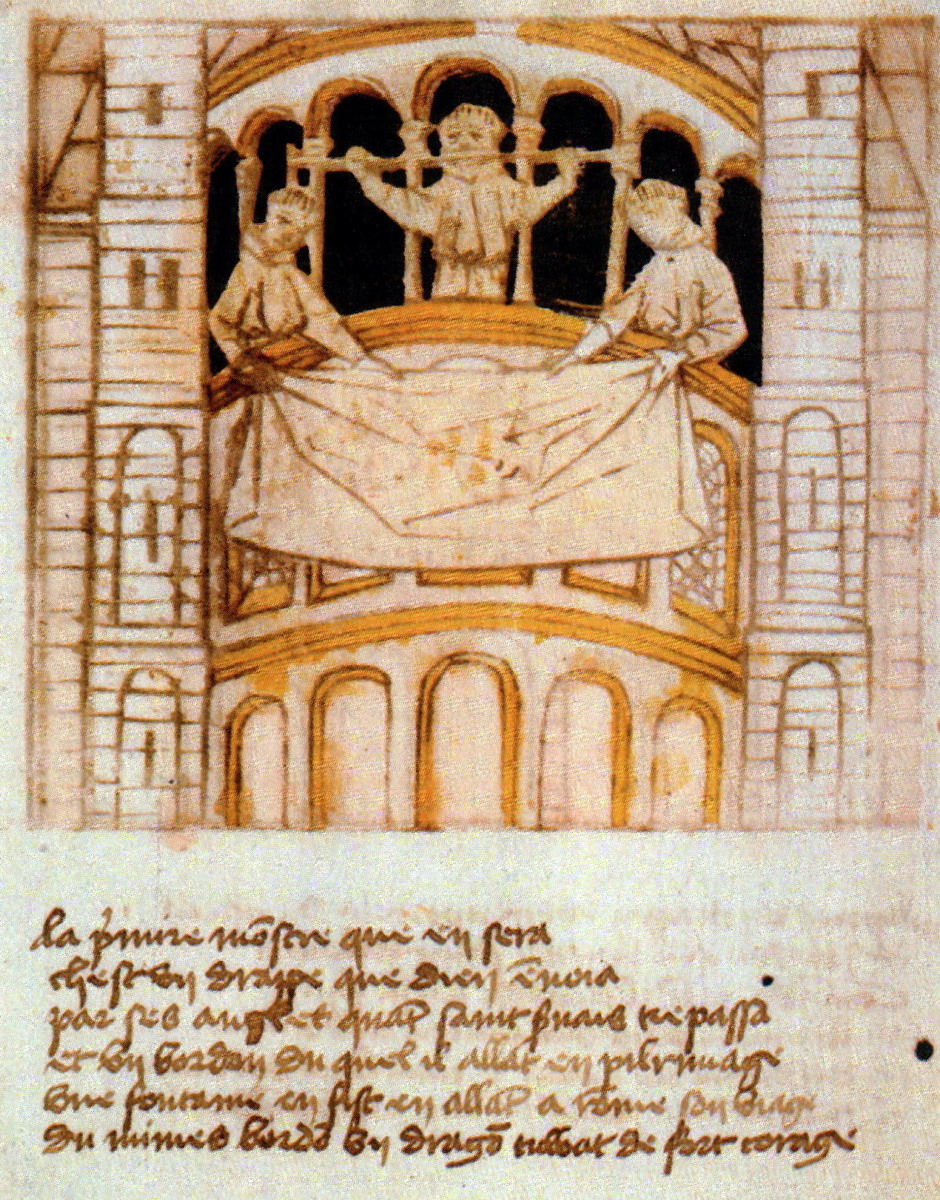
Relics shown from the dwarf gallery during the Septennial Pilgrimage (Blokboek van St Servaas, ±1460)

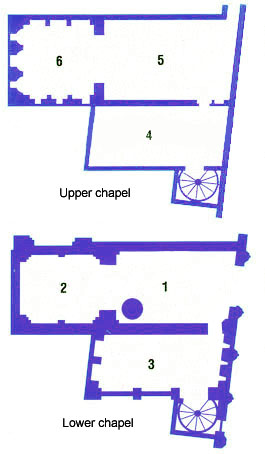
Floor plan: 1.Servatiana; 2.Bust of Saint Servatius; 3.Textiles; 4, 5 & 6.Liturgical objects

During the late Middle Ages the number of relics further increased. A septennial Pilgrimage of the Relics (Dutch: Heiligdomsvaart) attracted tens of thousands of pilgrims. At these occasions, the main relics were shown to the pilgrims gathered in Vrijthof square from the dwarf gallery. In 1579, the church treasure suffered badly during the Sack of Maastricht by the Spanish troops led by the Duke of Parma. In 1634, under the threat of war, the treasure was brought to Liège, where it remained for twenty years.

After the conquest of Maastricht by the French in 1794, the chapter of Saint Servatius was made to pay heavy war taxes. In order to pay these taxes gold and silver artefacts from the church treasure were melted down or sold. In 1798 the chapter was dissolved. A few important pieces had been brought into safety by the canons, some of which were given back after the church was restored to the religious service in 1804, but other pieces could not be retrieved. Some of the church's former treasures can now be found in museums and libraries around the world, such as the National Library of the Netherlands in The Hague, the Royal Museums of Art and History in Brussels, the Musée du Louvre in Paris, the Kunstgewerbemuseum in Berlin, the Alte Pinakothek in Munich, the Museum für Kunst und Gewerbe in Hamburg, the Victoria and Albert Museum in London and the Metropolitan Museum of Art and The Morgan Library & Museum in New York. The present treasure of the Basilica of Saint Servatius therefore, is much smaller than it once used to be.

== The building ==
In 1340 it was reported that the treasure of the church was kept in a dark vaulted room on the lower floor of what is called the double chapel. The double chapel is one of the oldest surviving parts of the church and dates back to the 11th century. It was built adjacent to the northern transept and can only be accessed via the cloisters. This seems to have been the permanent location of the treasury until 1873, when it moved to the former refectory and chapter school.

After the restoration of the double chapel in 1982, the treasury was once again housed in its original location. The treasury now occupies both floors of the double chapel and a side room on each level. The basement floor with archaeological excavations has been made accessible. The entrance to the treasury, via the East wing of the cloisters, is on Keizer Karelplein, which is also the main entrance to the church.

== The collection ==
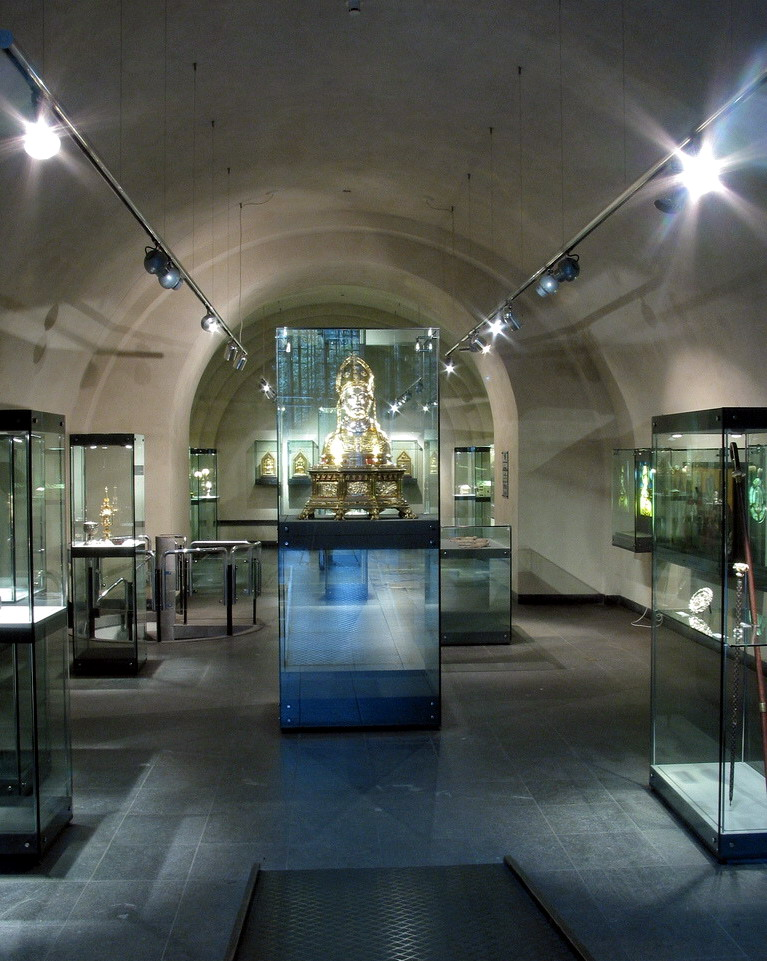
Interior lower chapel

The treasure of the Basilica of Saint Servatius traditionally consists of four parts: 1. the so-called Servatiana, objects traditionally associated with the life of Servatius, 2. relics and reliquaries, 3. liturgical implements and 4. ancient fabrics. The church's art collection and various archaeological finds are not part of the treasure but are also exhibited in the museum.

=== Servatiana ===
- The so-called Key of Saint Servatius: decorative key, one of the attributes of the saint, silver (Aachen workshop, early 9th century).
- The so-called Pectoral cross of Saint Servatius: silver and golden cross (wooden core), with enamel and gemstones (Trier?, 10th or 11th century), a gift to the church from the duke of Bavaria.
- The cup of Saint Servatius: millefiori glass, Roman (1st century).
- The travelling chalice and paten of Saint Servatius: a silver chalice and a silver paten (13th century).
- The pilgrim's staff of Saint Servatius: a wooden staff with silver fittings and an intricately carved ivory crook (9th century).
- The crozier of Saint Servatius: wooden staff with ivory crook (12th century).
- The portable altar of Saint Servatius: green serpentine stone with silver ornaments (12th century).

=== Reliquaries ===
- The Shrine of Saint Servatius: an oak wooden chest, covered with gilded copper and decorated with enamel, vernis brun, cabochons and filigree (±1160). The 'Noodkist' was originally positioned on the main choir of the church and was accompanied by four gabled reliquaries, that in 1843 were sold and are now in the Royal Museums of Art and History in Brussels. In 2020, the shrine was moved back permanently into the church.
- The Bust of Saint Servatius: reliquary bust containing the skull of the saint, donated by Alexander Farnese, Duke of Parma after the Sack of Maastricht (1579) in which the original bust was largely lost.
- The Maastricht patriarchal cross: a tall patriarchal cross containing 32 relics of the True Cross. The double cross mounted on the elaborate base is older, although its exact age is unknown. The base was made around 1490 by the Maastricht silversmith Master Ulrich Peters, who originally came from Nuremberg.
- The Arm reliquary of Saint Thomas: an arm-shaped silver reliquary from the 15th century with relics of Saint Thomas the Apostle.

=== Liturgical implements ===
This part of the treasure suffered most during the French period (1794-1814). Many chalices, patens, monstrances and other liturgical objects made of gold or silver were melted down in order to pay the war taxes that the French demanded from the canons. However, a few liturgical vessels from the Middle Ages survived and quite a few from the Baroque period (notably some Maastricht silver pieces) are still in the collection.

=== Textiles ===
The medieval textiles collection of the Basilica of Saint Servatius is counted among the most important of its kind. From 1989 till 1991 the textiles were carefully restored and documented by specialists from the Swiss Abegg-Stiftung in Riggisberg. Among the best pieces in the collection are the so-called albe of Saint Servatius and the robe of Monulph. Furthermore, there is an extensive collection of early-Medieval woven silks (some dating back to the 7th century) from Constantinople, Egypt and Central Asia and various medieval woven materials from the Meuse-Rhine area, Spain, Italy and the Middle East.

=== Art collection ===
The art collection of the Treasury of the Basilica of Saint Servatius consists of a modest collection of paintings, prints, illuminated manuscripts, wood carving, stone sculptures, alabaster and ivory carving, enamels, and gold and silver smithing. The collection includes several medieval ivory caskets, some decorated with elaborate carvings of human figures and animals. One example is an eleventh- or twelfth-century casket that may have originated in southern Italy or Sicily and displays clear Arab influences. A close parallel is the so-called Morgan Casket at the Metropolitan Museum of Art in New York City, whose panel arrangement and depictions of humans and animals are strikingly similar to those of the Maastricht casket, although its provenance is unknown.

=== Archaeology ===
Archaeological excavations took place in the double chapel in 1981-82. Underneath the ground level floor of the Sacrarium inferior canons' grave stones were found, some dating back to the 13th century. Also, parts of walls were excavated that at the time were interpreted as the remains of a Carolingian polygonal church. As it turned out, the walls belonged to polygonal transept arms of a 10th or 11th century church. These remains can be seen in the basement underneath the treasury. Part of the archaeological collection is on display in the lapidarium in the eastern crypt. An important find was the 1086 funeral cross of Humbert, who was provost of the chapter of Saint Lambert's Cathedral in Liège and Saint Servatius in Maastricht. It was he who had the double chapel built which is today the church treasury.

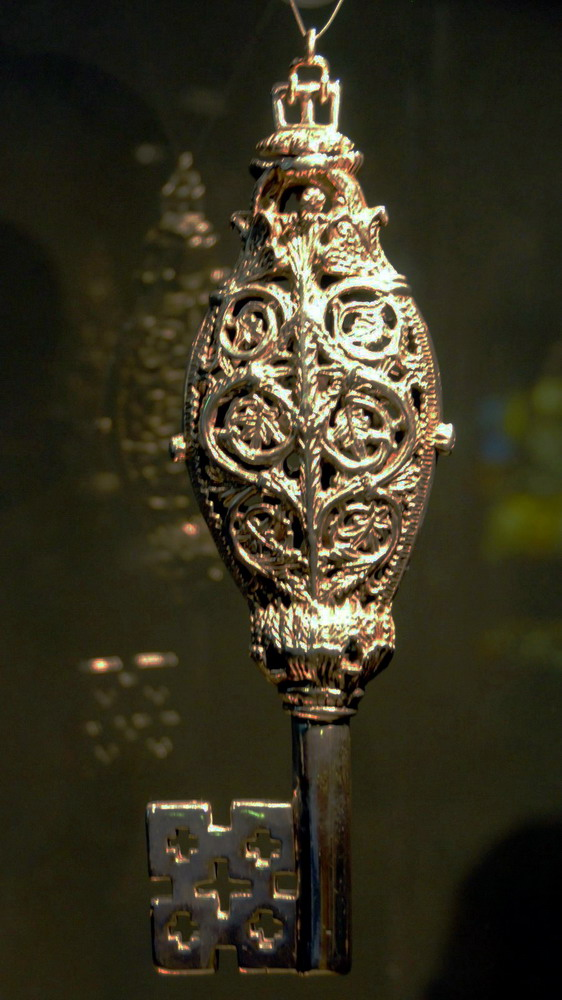
Key of St Servatius

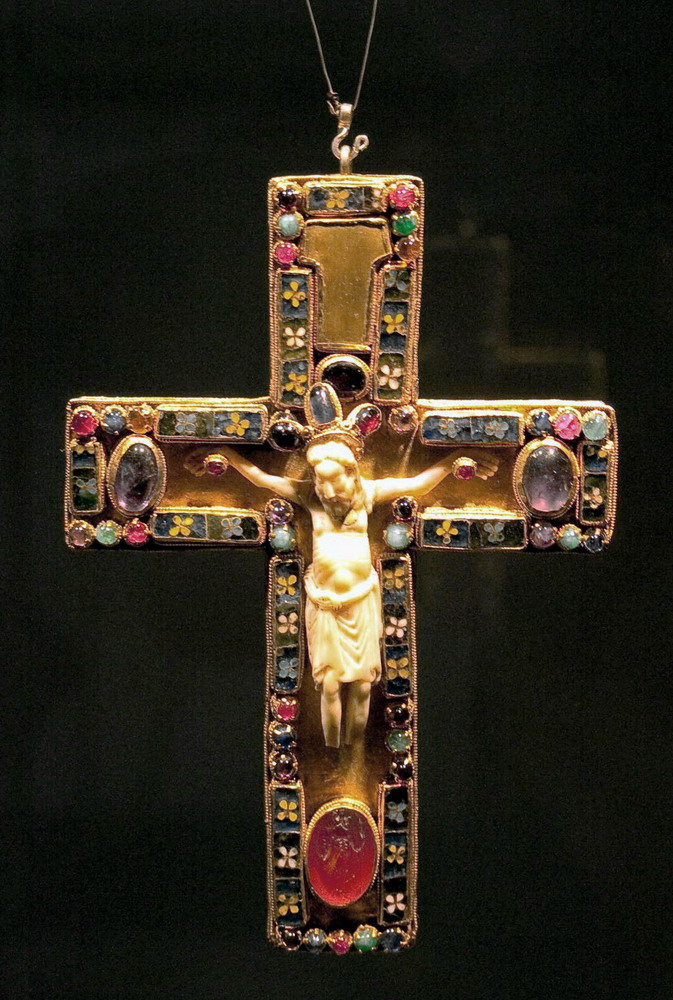
Pectoral cross

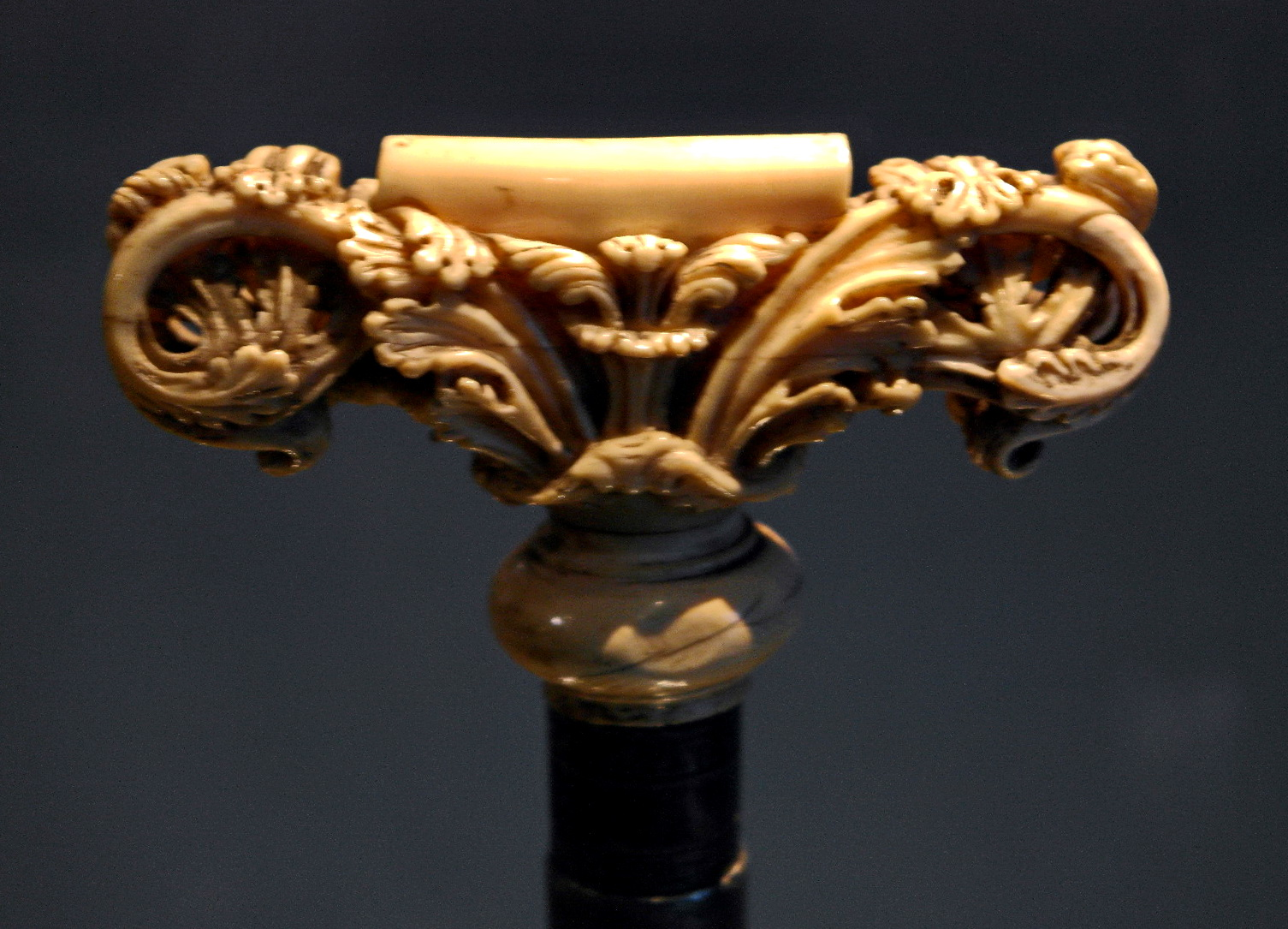
Pilgrim's staff of St Servatius

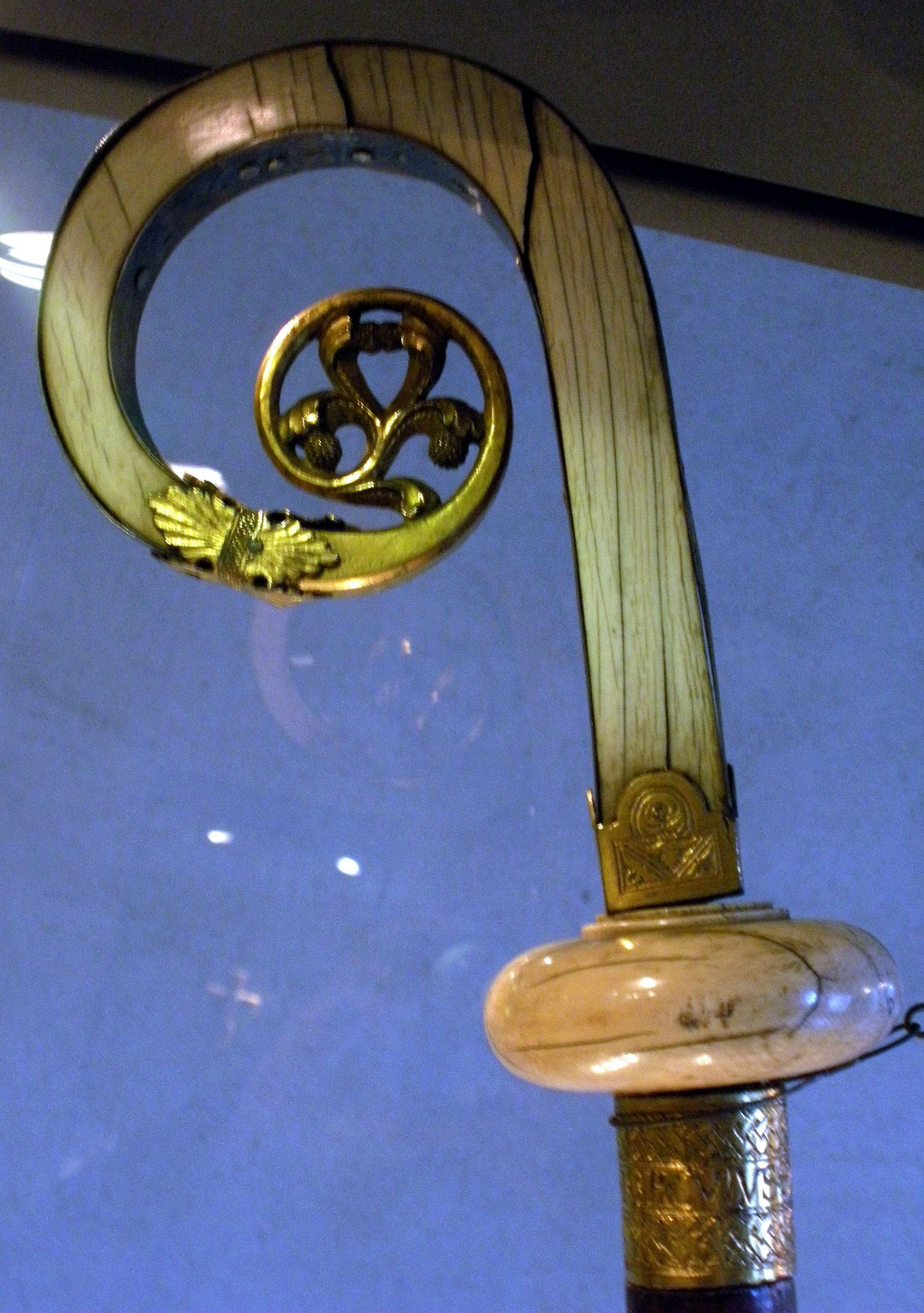
Crozier of St Servatius

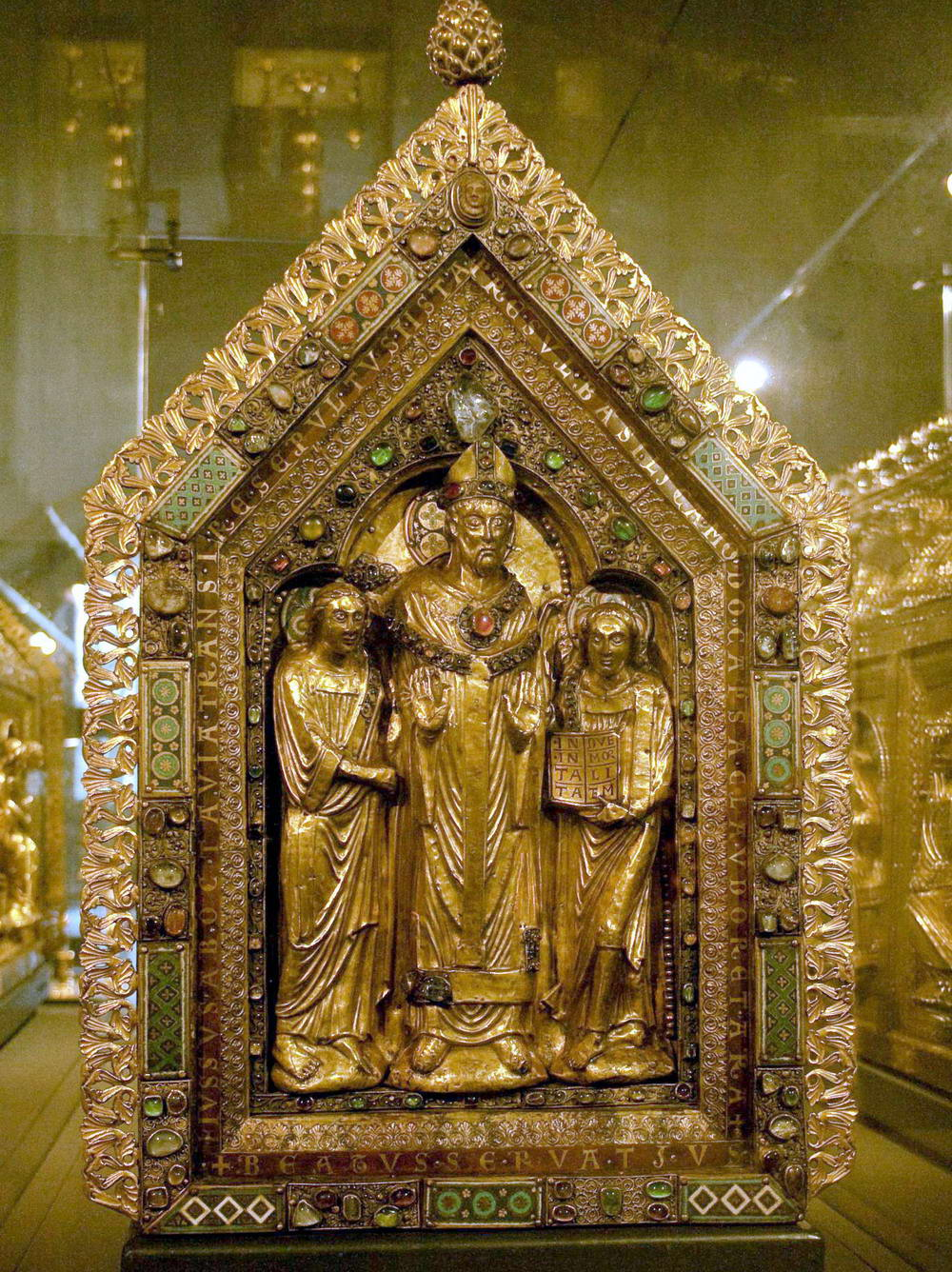
Reliquary chest ('Noodkist')

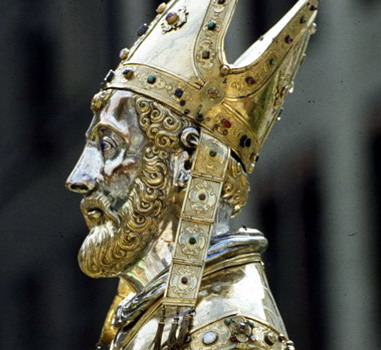
Portrait bust St Servatius

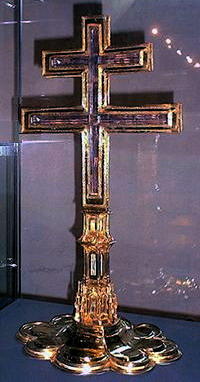
Patriarchal cross

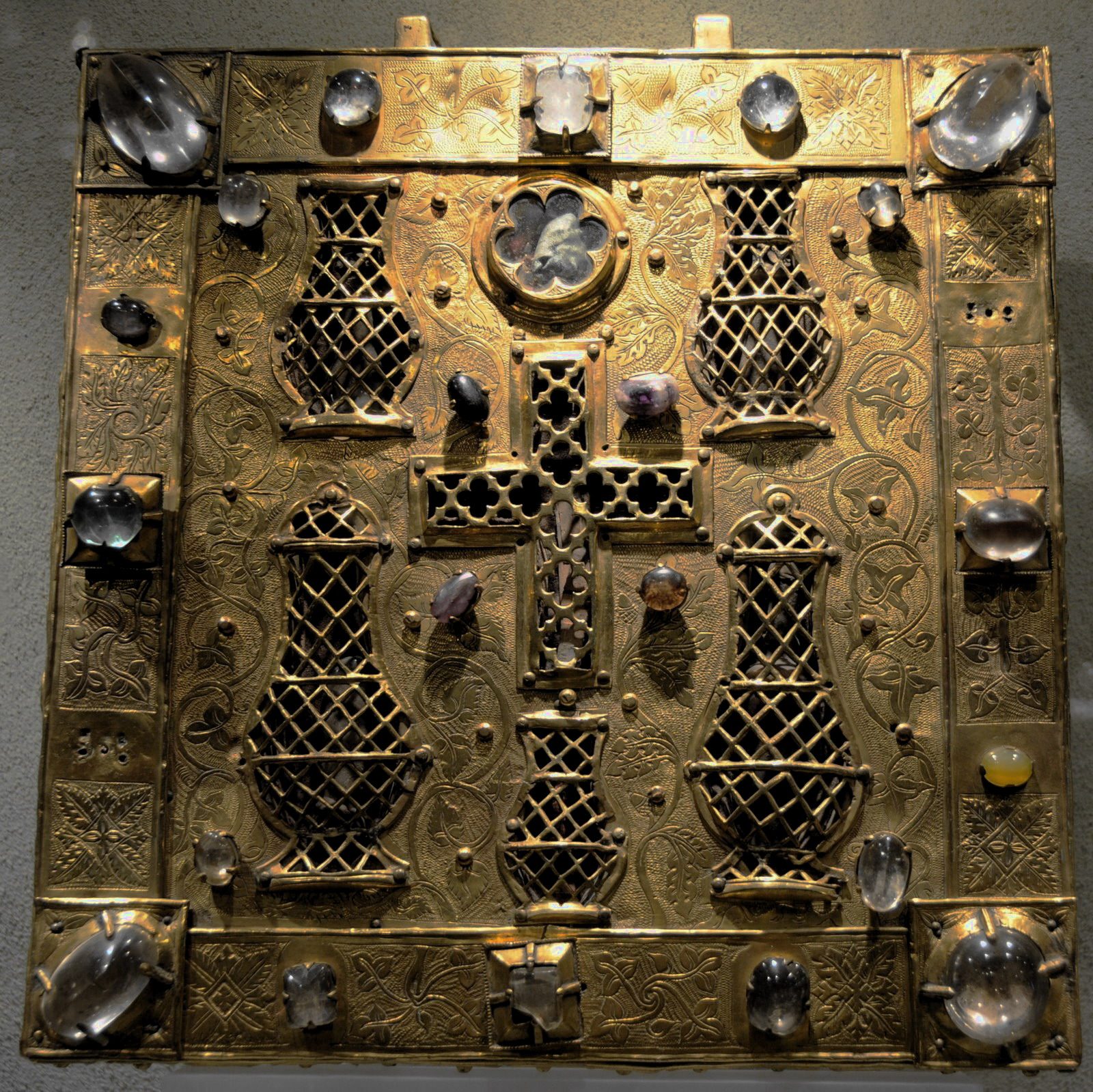
Reliquary tablet

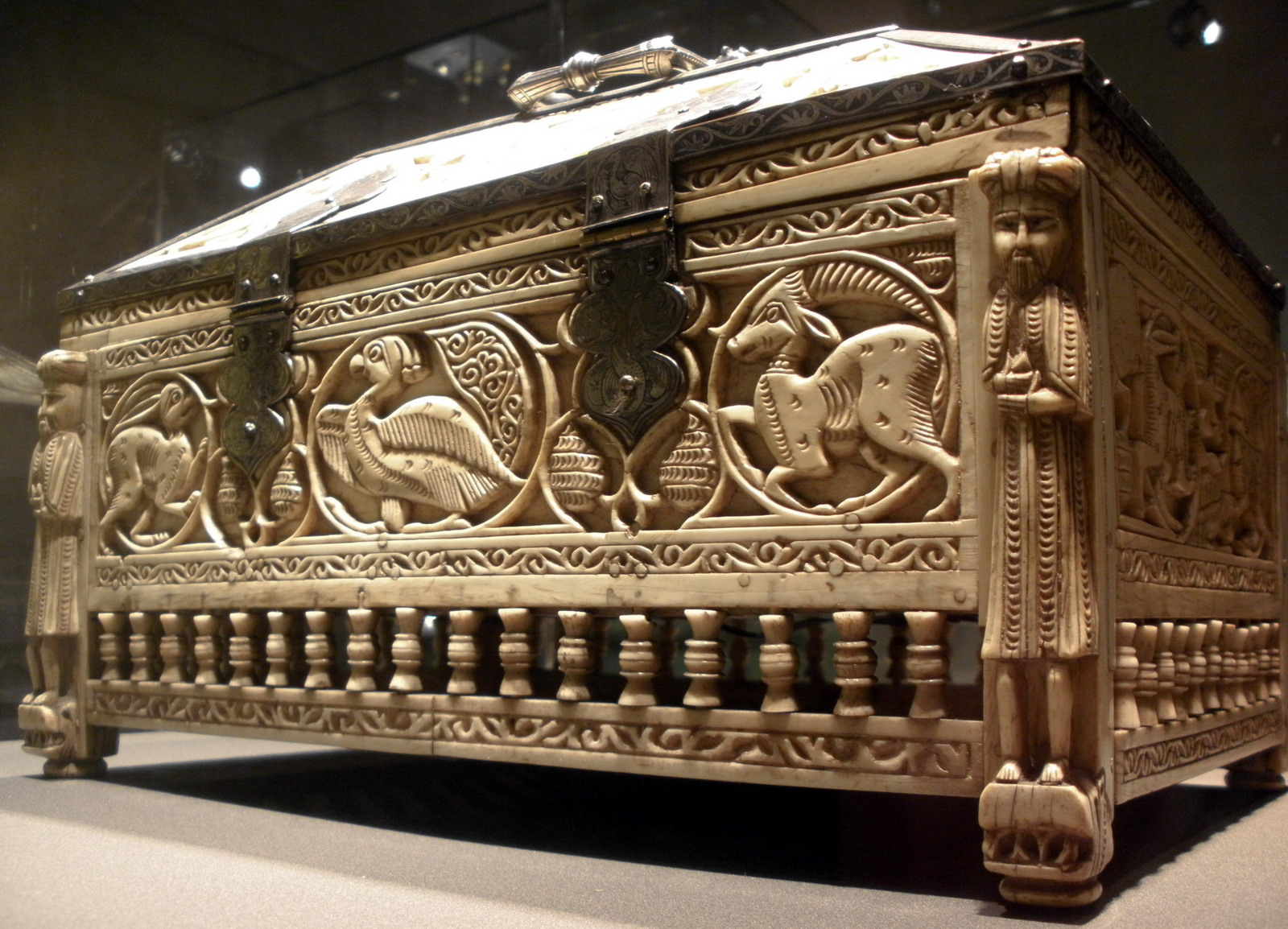
Ivory reliquary

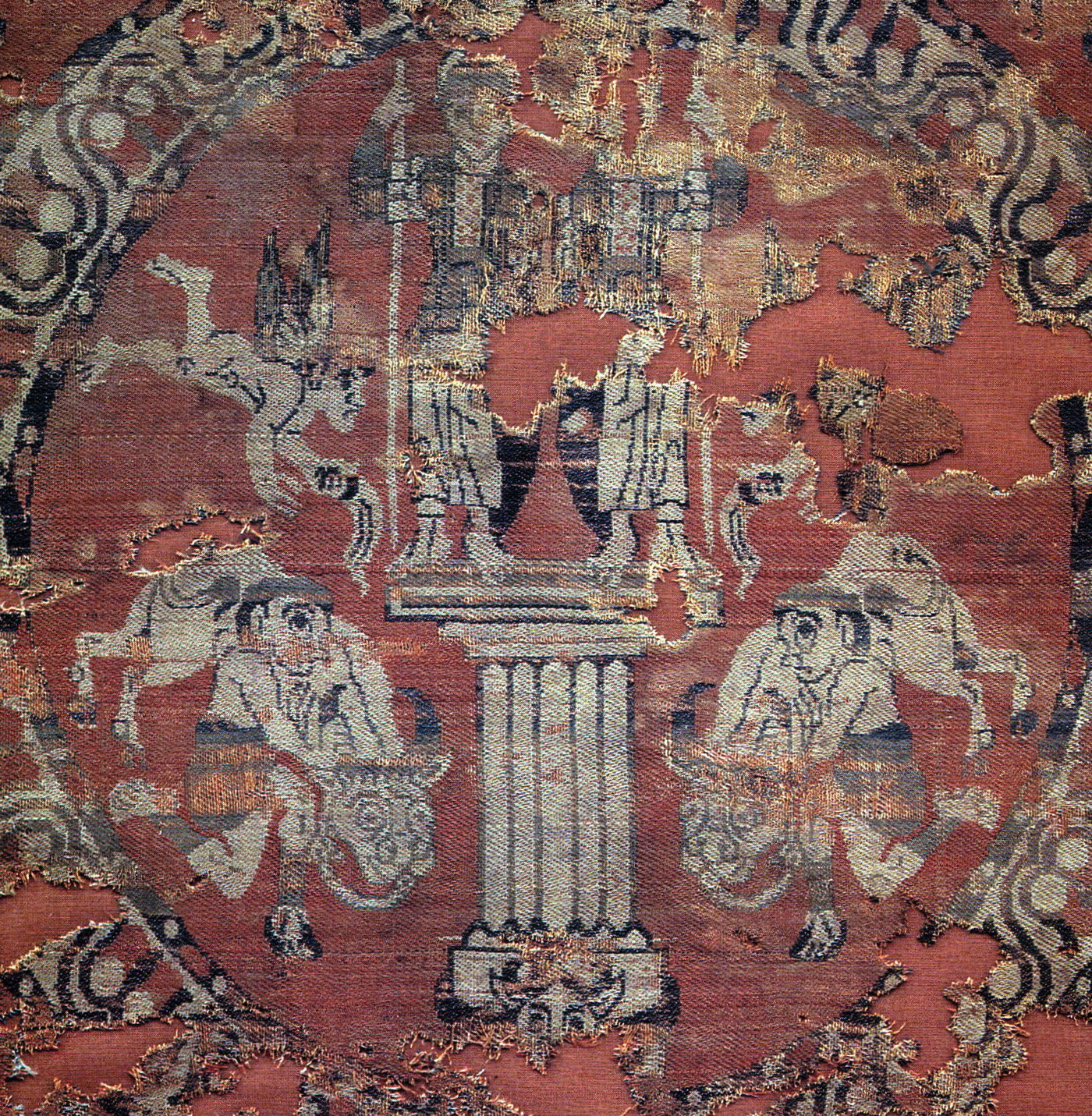
Silk cloth

== See also ==
- Treasury of the Basilica of Our Lady (Maastricht)
- Aachen Cathedral Treasury
- Trier Cathedral Treasury
- Liège Cathedral Treasury

== Bibliography ==
- Koldeweij, A.M., Der gude Sente Servas. Assen/Maastricht, 1985
- Kroos, R., Der Schrein des heiligen Servatius in Maastricht und die vier zugehörigen Reliquiare in Brüssel. Munich, 1985
- Stauffer, A., Die mittelalterlichen Textilien von St. Servatius in Maastricht. Bern, 1991
- Tagage, S., & various photographers, Kunstschatten uit de St.-Servaas. Maastricht, 1976
- Ubachs, P.J.H., and I.M.H. Evers, Historische Encyclopedie Maastricht. Zutphen, 2005
- Van Cauteren, J., and others, Schatkamers uit het Zuiden. Utrecht, 1985
