= Karlsschrein =

Shrine-like naval containing Charlemagne's remains

Coordinates: 50.7747°N 6.0844°E

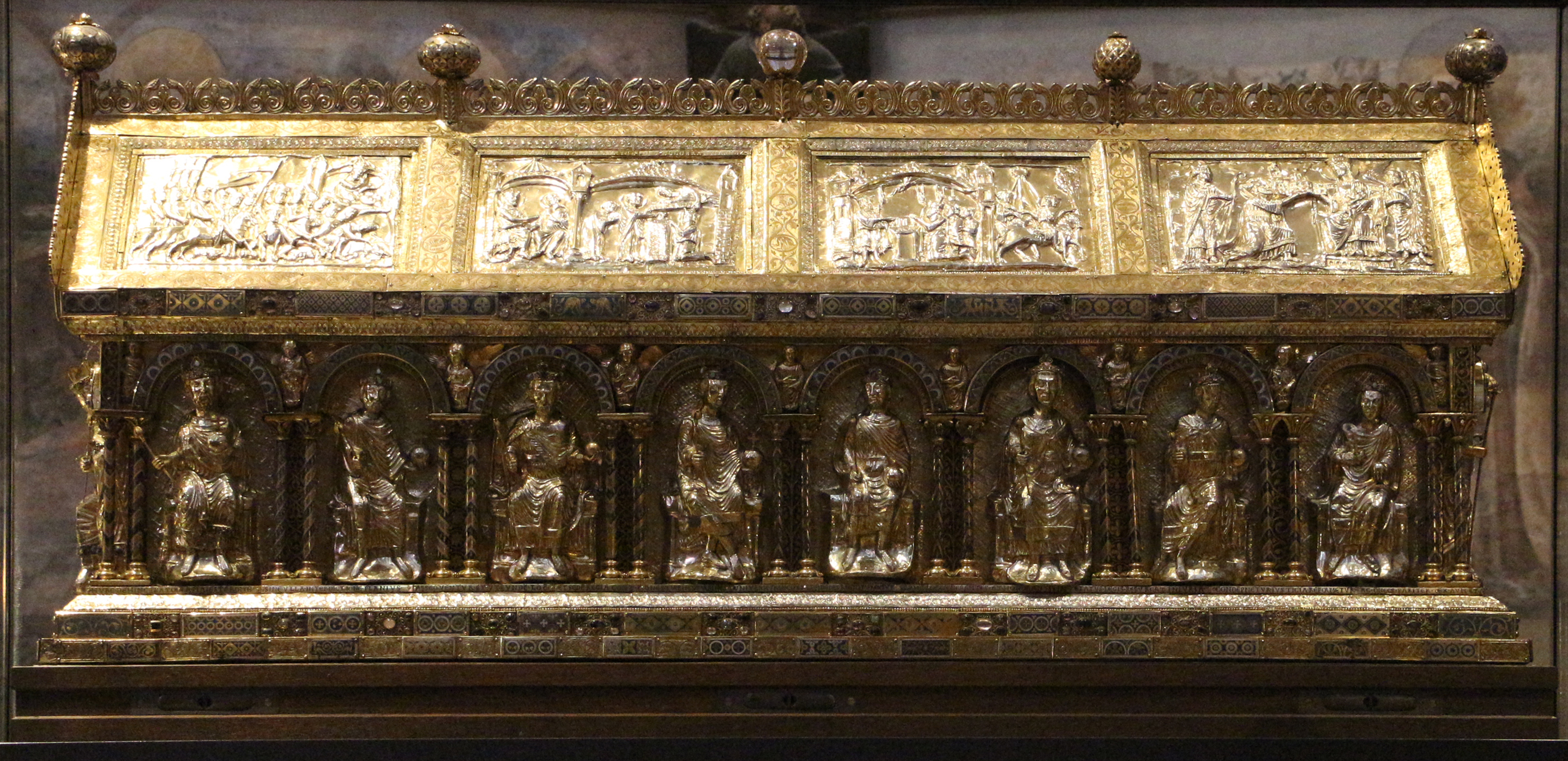
Karlsschrein at Aachen Cathedral

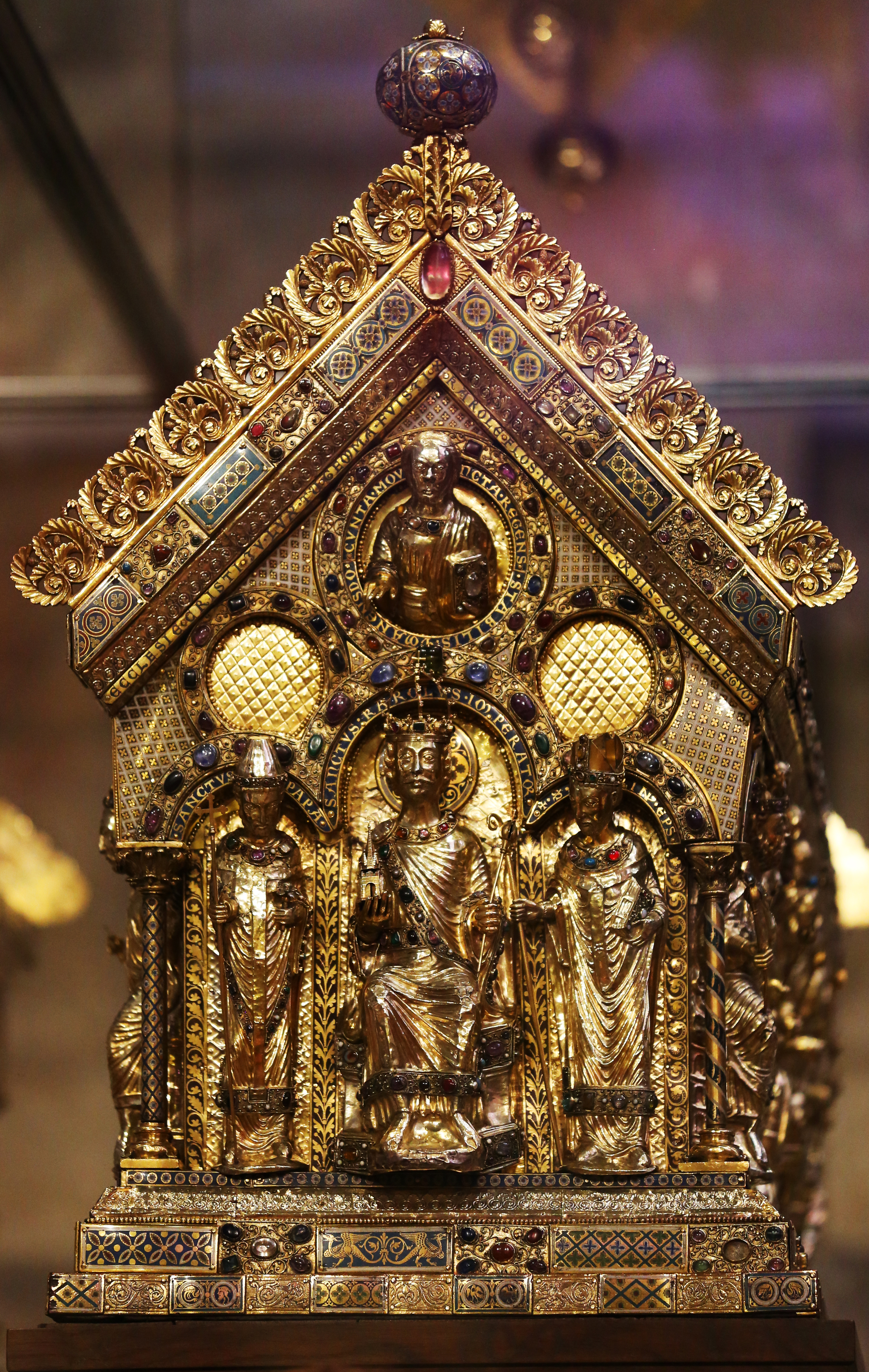
Front gable end

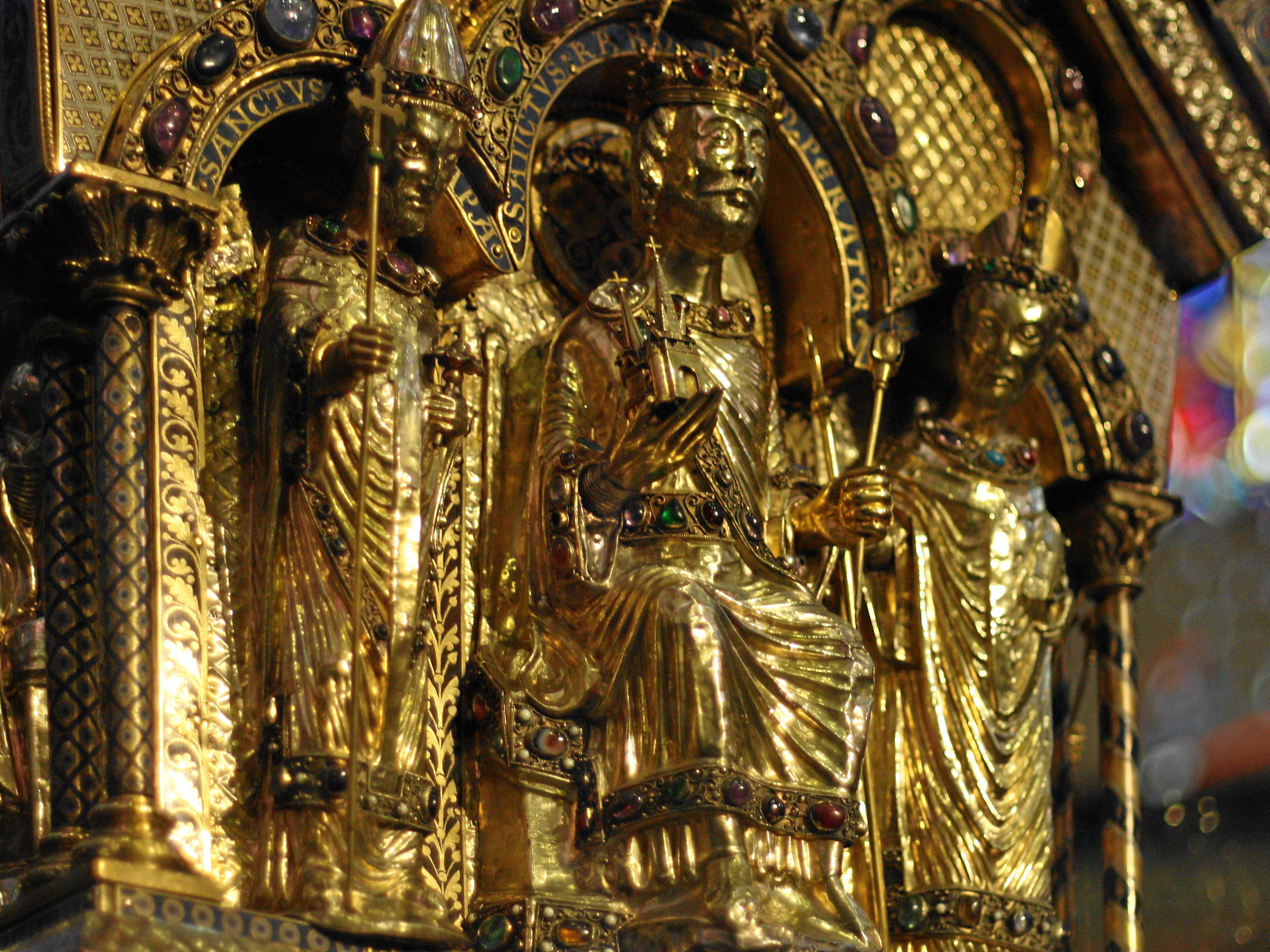
Detail: Charlemagne enthroned between church officials

The Karlsschrein (English: Shrine of Charlemagne) is located in Aachen Cathedral and contains the remains of Charlemagne. It was completed in 1215 in Aachen at the command of Frederick II, Holy Roman Emperor. Charlemagne's remains had been in the Palatine Chapel of the cathedral until 1165, when Frederick Barbarossa placed the remains in a sarcophagus beneath the floor of the cathedral.

== History ==
Frederick II personally carried out the transfer of the bones and the sealing of the shrine on 27 July 1215, the first anniversary of the Battle of Bouvines, which had spurred him to seek the German throne. Two days before, he had been crowned again and finally as the King of the Romans at Aachen.

== Construction ==
The Shrine is part of the late 12th century shrine tradition. It has the form of a naved church, without a transept. It is an oak box 2.04 metres long, 0.57 metres wide, and 0.94 metres high (80.3in by 22.4in by 37.0in), decorated with gilt silver, gilt copper, filigree, precious stones, and enamel. The double step of the base is adorned with enamel plates, engravings, filigree, and silver stamped with floral designs. The two long sides each show an arcade of eight archways resting on double columns, in which the kings and emperors of the realm are enthroned.

The front gable end shows Charlemagne enthroned, with Pope Leo III standing to his right and Archbishop Turpin of Rheims to his left. A half-figure of Christ is located in a medallion above Charlemagne. The ornamentation is mostly geometric and floral.

On the rear gable end the Madonna with Christ is enthroned between the Archangels Michael and Gabriel. Three half-figures, the personifications of Faith, Hope, and Love, are depicted above.

The two surfaces of the roof show four reliefs with scenes from the romanticised life of Charlemagne. A crest of gilded copper, with five towers, decorates the ridge and gable of the roof.

Each of the long sides of the shrine depicts eight enthroned emperors. Shown on its right side, as viewed from the front gable end, are the following (from left to right): Henry II, Otto III, Otto I, Otto II, Charles the Fat, an unnamed Emperor, Henry VI, and Frederick II. Depicted on the opposite side are Henry III, Zwentibold, Henry V, Henry IV, Otto IV, Henry I, Lothair I, and Louis the Pious.

== The iconographic concept ==
The composition is determined by Hohenstaufen imperial thought. Charlemagne is enthroned on the front between the representatives of the church at a location which is reserved on all other shrines for Christ alone. He himself, Emperor Charlemagne, is the viceroy of Christ, towering over the Pope and the archbishop. On the two long sides of the shrine, otherwise reserved for Prophets and Apostles, sixteen Holy Roman Emperors and Kings are enthroned, the roof reliefs continue the imperial character of the composition. These show the legendary life of Charlemagne, based on the Historia Karoli Magni et Rothalandi, allegedly written by Archbishop Turpin of Rheims (c. 748–749). However, modern research has revealed that the Historia Karoli was actually composed around 1130–1140 in France.

== Anthropological investigation ==
In 1874, the Aachen Stiftkapitel allowed a scientific investigation of the remains of Charlemagne to be carried out by Hermann Schaaffhausen (1816–1893), an anthropologist from Bonn. From the remains Schaafhausen determined a height of 2.04 metres (6 ft 8 in). This height, which was especially rare in the Middle Ages, was reported by Einhard, "for it is known that in height he measured seven of his feet" (nam septem suorum pedum proceritatem eius constat habuisse mensuram). The right collarbone had broken and rehealed. No historian mentions this injury. The skull shows a dolichocephalic form (elongated), the seams closed without a trace, which is a sign of old age. The findings indicate the authenticity of the remains.

However, according to a more recent article, estimates of Charlemagne's height done by different methods (but all based on the dimensions of his left tibia) range from 1.79 metres to 1.92 metres and average 1.84 metres (6 ft 0 in). That would still make Charlemagne very tall by the standards of his time.

== Inventory and securing, 1983–88 ==
On 30 January 1983, during a vespers service, the sealed zinc box with the remains of Charlemagne was taken out of the shrine and opened. In the evening of the same day, the box was resealed and the remains were put in a provisional wooden shrine. At night, the Karlsschrein itself was brought into the cathedral goldsmiths' workshop, where the goldsmiths Gerhard Thewis and Peter Bolg worked for five years under the scholarly direction of Herta Lepie on the conservation of the artwork. Here, care was taken that apart from this conservation a restoration or renovation was not made – as frequently happened in the repair of artworks in the past – which would have irreversibly changed the shrine or damaged its original form.

== Bibliography ==
- Florentine Mütherich, Dietrich Kötzsche (ed.): Der Schrein Karls des Grossen. Bestand und Sicherung 1982-1988. Aachen: Einhard, 1998, ISBN 3-930701-45-6.
- Helga Giersiepen: Die Inschriften des Aachener Doms (= Die Deutschen Inschriften, 31). Wiesbaden: Reichert, 1992, ISBN 3-88226-511-6, p. 29–36 (online).
- Ernst Günther Grimme: Der Karlsschrein und der Marienschrein im Aachener Dom, Aachen: Einhard, 2002, ISBN 3-936342-01-6.
