= Monulph =

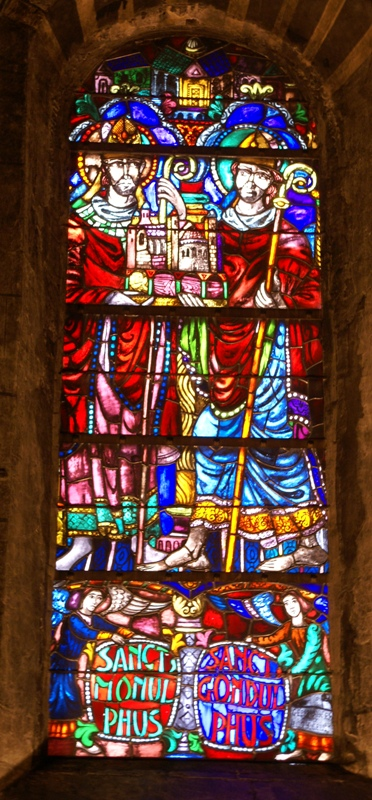
Monulph and Gondulph, stained glass window, Basilica of Our Lady (Maastricht)

Monulph was a sixth-century bishop of Tongeren and Maastricht, and is revered as a Roman Catholic saint.

Little is known about his life. The Acta Sanctorum only lists two vitae of Monulph, none of them older than the 11th century. His birthplace has been given as Dinant, and his father's name as Randace, count of Dinant. His date of death is traditionally given as 588. Late Medieval bishops mention him as the 21st bishop of the Tongeren-Maastricht-Liège bishopric.

According to some historians, it was Monulph who moved the see of the old diocese of Tongeren to Maastricht. In practice the bishops of Tongeren had resided there from the beginning of the sixth century. Although it is not known for sure which Maastricht church served as Monulph's cathedral, it is assumed that this must have been the church of Our Lady, which was situated within the Roman castrum. However, no excavations have been carried out inside that church. Louis Duchesne has suggested that Monulph succeeded Saint Servatius directly (in contradiction with the account of the sixth-century bishop and historian Gregory of Tours).

According to Gregory of Tours in his Liber de Gloria Confessorum, Monulph built a large stone church (templum magnum) on the grave of Saint Servatius, just outside the castrum of Maastricht. This church, originally dedicated to Saint Salvator, was excavated in the 1980s. It later became the Basilica of Saint Servatius. In 1039, the remains of Monulph (and Gondulph) were elevated in a ceremony attended by Henry III, Holy Roman Emperor. Humbert, the then provost of the chapter of Saint Servatius, placed a cenotaph in the axis of the newly built 11th-century church. This cenotaph, which was removed in 1628 and rediscovered in 1890, can now be seen in the eastern crypt of the church.

According to tradition, Monulph's successor was Gondulph, who may well be entirely legendary since no historical facts are known about him. Monulph and Gondulph are both Catholic saints, usually depicted together and sharing the same feast day: July 16. The Catholic Encyclopedia of 1913 raised the question of whether they may refer to the same person.

A 13th-century legend, based on a misreading of an older text, tells the story of Saint Monulph and Saint Gondulph rising from their graves to attend the consecration of Aachen Cathedral in 1139. Both saints are credited with efforts of rebuilding the destroyed city of Tongeren. Another tradition holds that Monulph founded the chapel of Cosmas and Damian in 588 at the river confluence of Meuse and Ourthe, in a place that would later become the city of Liège. Likewise, it is said that the chapel of Embourg (Chaudfontaine) was consecrated by Monulph in 556.

In the city archives of Chartres, a 7th-century attestation referring to Monulph is kept that was once part of a relic in Chartres Cathedral. In the Treasury of the Basilica of Saint Servatius a so-called "robe of Saint Monulph" is kept, which probably dates from the 13th century.

== Bibliography ==
- Raymond Van Dam, Glory of the Confessors (annotated translation of Gregory of Tours' Liber de Gloria Confessorum), 1988
- (in Dutch) Régis de la Haye, De bisschoppen van Maastricht. Maastricht, 1985
- (in German) Renate Kroos, Der Schrein des heiligen Servatius in Maastricht und die vier zugehörigen Reliquiare in Brüssel. Munich, 1985
- De Sint Servaas (bi-monthly restoration bulletins, 1-65). Maastricht, 1982-1992
