= Renate Kroos =

German art historian (1931–2017)

- Kroos in about 1983
- Born: 24 January 1931; Detmold, Germany
- Died: 9 October 2017 (aged 86); Munich, Germany
- Education: University of Göttingen
- Occupations: art historian, medievalist
- Employer(s): Berlin State Library, Zentralinstitut für Kunstgeschichte
- Known for: Studies of medieval art; Shrine of Saint Servatius

Renate Kroos (24 January 1931 – 9 October 2017) was a German art historian and medievalist. In the Netherlands and Belgium, she was particularly known for her extensive study of the 12th-century Shrine of Saint Servatius in Maastricht and the four associated reliquaries, now in Brussels.

== Life and career ==
Kroos studied art history at the University of Göttingen. In 1957 she completed her doctoral dissertation there on medieval linen and silk embroidery in Lower Saxony. The dissertation was subsequently published in substantially revised form in 1970 as Niedersächsische Bildstickereien des Mittelalters. She was among the first scholars to devote attention to the lives and artistic production of women in medieval convents. The 1970 publication was issued by the Deutscher Verein für Kunstwissenschaft, but initially received little attention from fellow scholars. After completing her studies, she worked for several years at the Berlin State Library.

From 1971, Kroos was a research fellow at the Zentralinstitut für Kunstgeschichte (ZI) in Munich. She was also a member of the editorial board of Kunstchronik. During her two decades at the institute, she led several research projects. The most extensive, conceived as early as 1970, resulted in 1985 in a monograph on the Shrine of Saint Servatius (Dutch: Noodkist) in the Basilica of Saint Servatius in Maastricht and the four associated reliquaries originally belonging to it, now in the Art & History Museum in Brussels. The large-format book contains an extensive text section and a separate section of illustrations. Der Schrein des heiligen Servatius in Maastricht und die vier zugehörigen Reliquiare in Brüssel demonstrates extensive scholarship and places the creation and use of the Noodkist in the context of the history of the collegiate chapter of Saint Servatius, local liturgy, and practices of popular devotion.

Kroos published several monographs (see Selected publications) and numerous scholarly articles, particularly on medieval churches, monasteries and works of art. In her studies of the cathedrals of Bamberg, Cologne, Magdeburg and Regensburg, she developed the approach she had taken in her study of the Noodkist: the history of how a building was used received as much attention as its art-historical analysis. She also studied codicology to broaden her expertise in art history. After her retirement in 1991, she remained active as an independent researcher and writer.

== Honours and commemorations ==
- In 2001, on the occasion of Kroos's seventieth birthday, the Frankfurter Allgemeine Zeitung published an article about her work, describing her as the "ungekrönte Königin unter den Mediävisten" ("uncrowned queen among medievalists").
- On 5–6 March 2001, a two-day colloquium in her honour was held at the Zentralinstitut für Kunstgeschichte in Munich.
- In 2002, Kroos received an honorary doctorate from the theological faculty of Humboldt University of Berlin, in recognition of her research extending beyond art history into church history.
- On 26–27 April 2019, a two-day colloquium commemorating Kroos was held at the Leipzig University of Applied Sciences (HTWK Leipzig).

== Selected publications ==
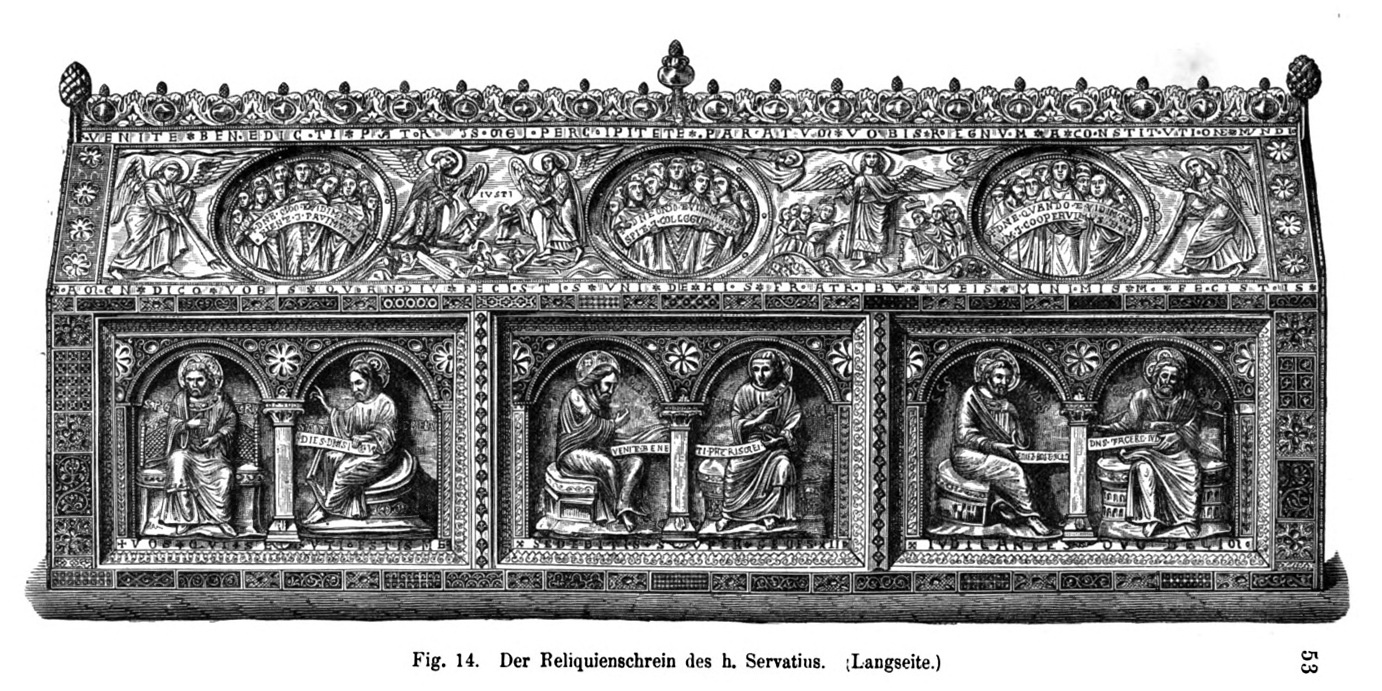
The Shrine of Saint Servatius (Noodkist). Woodcut from Franz Bock and Michaël Willemsen's 1872 publication on the treasuries of the collegiate churches of Maastricht.

- 1957: Niedersächsische figürliche Leinen- und Seidenstickereien des 12. bis 14. Jahrhunderts (doctoral dissertation)
- 1964: Drei niedersächsische Bildhandschriften des 13. Jahrhunderts in Wien. Göttingen, Vandenhoeck & Ruprecht
- 1970: Niedersächsische Bildstickereien des Mittelalters (published version of her dissertation). Berlin: Deutscher Verlag für Kunstwissenschaft
- 1980: Das Matutinalbuch aus Scheyern (with Hermann Hauke)
- 1981: Zu frühen Schrift- und Bildzeugnissen über die heilige Elisabeth als Quellen zur Kunst- und Kulturgeschichte
- 1985: Der Schrein des heiligen Servatius in Maastricht und die vier zugehörigen Reliquiare in Brüssel. Munich: Zentralinstitut für Kunstgeschichte. ISBN 978-3-422-00772-7
- 1987: Das Goslarer Evangeliar
- 1989: Die Weingartner Liederhandschrift (with Wolfgang Irtenkauf, Kurt Herbert Halbach and Otfrid Ehrismann)
- 1991: Glanzlichter der Buchkunst (1): Das Goslarer Evangeliar (with Frauke Steenbock). Graz: Akademische Druck- und Verlagsanstalt
- 1995: Der Dom zu Regensburg. Vom Bauen und Gestalten einer gotischen Kathedrale (with Achim Hubel, Manfred Schuller and Friedrich Fuchs)
- 2001: Das Brandenburger Hungertuch (with Christa M. Jeitner). Brandenburg an der Havel
