= Key of Saint Servatius =

The key on display in a case in the Treasury in 2016

The Key of Saint Servatius is an object of Carolingian metalwork preserved in the treasury of the Basilica of Saint Servatius in Maastricht, the Netherlands. Made of silver and originally gilded, the object is attributed to a workshop operating in the vicinity of the Palace of Aachen. It may have been brought to Maastricht by Einhard.

The key is an attribute of Saint Servatius and belongs to a group of objects known as the Servatiana, which are traditionally associated with the saint's life. The association between the key and the saint derives from medieval tradition, while art-historical analysis dates the surviving object to the Carolingian period.

== History ==
The Key of Saint Servatius has been part of the treasury of Saint Servatius' Church in Maastricht for centuries. It was first mentioned by Jocundus in the 11th century and was first depicted in the 12th century on a relief panel in the church's westwork. How the key came to Maastricht is not known with certainty.

The lost Einhard Arch (silver-plated 3D reconstruction, 2018)

In 1985, the Dutch art historian A. M. Koldeweij proposed that the key was most likely made in the workshops associated with the Palace of Aachen in the early 9th century. (Note: Earlier scholars, including authors of the 17th-century Acta Sanctorum, believed that the key dated from the lifetime of Saint Servatius in the 4th century. Franz Bock and Michaël Willemsen, as well as Jules Helbig, held this view in the late 19th century. Their contemporaries, the Maastricht brothers Alexander and Arnaud Schaepkens, were the first to argue that the key was considerably later in date and might have been made in the Romanesque period. This view remained predominant for about a century. In the 1970s, Joseph Timmers and Dietrich Kötzsche dated the key to the 10th or 11th century. Around the same time, W. Sanderson suggested that it had been made in Trier towards the end of the 9th century. Since Koldeweij's study of the Servatiana was published in 1985, production in the workshops of Aachen in the early 9th century has been the leading theory (Koldeweij 1985, pp. 61–131, especially pp. 69–70).) Einhard may have played a role in its arrival in Maastricht. Also known as Eginhardus, Einhard was a scholar, poet and chronicler at the court of Charlemagne and his successor, Louis the Pious, in Aachen. He was also a lay abbot of several imperial monasteries, including the collegiate church of Saint Servatius in Maastricht. Through Einhard, the relics of the holy martyrs Peter and Marcellinus came into the possession of Saint Servatius' Church. The so-called Einhard Arch, a silver base in the form of a Roman triumphal arch that once supported an altar cross with relics of the True Cross, is also associated with him. The cross has long been considered lost. The base disappeared at the end of the 18th century, along with the reliquary shrine of Peter and Marcellinus, although the relics themselves survived. According to Maastricht art historian and archaeologist Titus Panhuysen, there are grounds for believing that these valuable and sacred gifts—the key, the base and the relics—formed part of a significant donation to the collegiate church of Saint Servatius. The presence of this royal treasure at the tomb of Saint Servatius may point to the close ties between the church and the Carolingian dynasty, and may also help explain the interest in Maastricht shown by the dukes of Lower Lorraine.

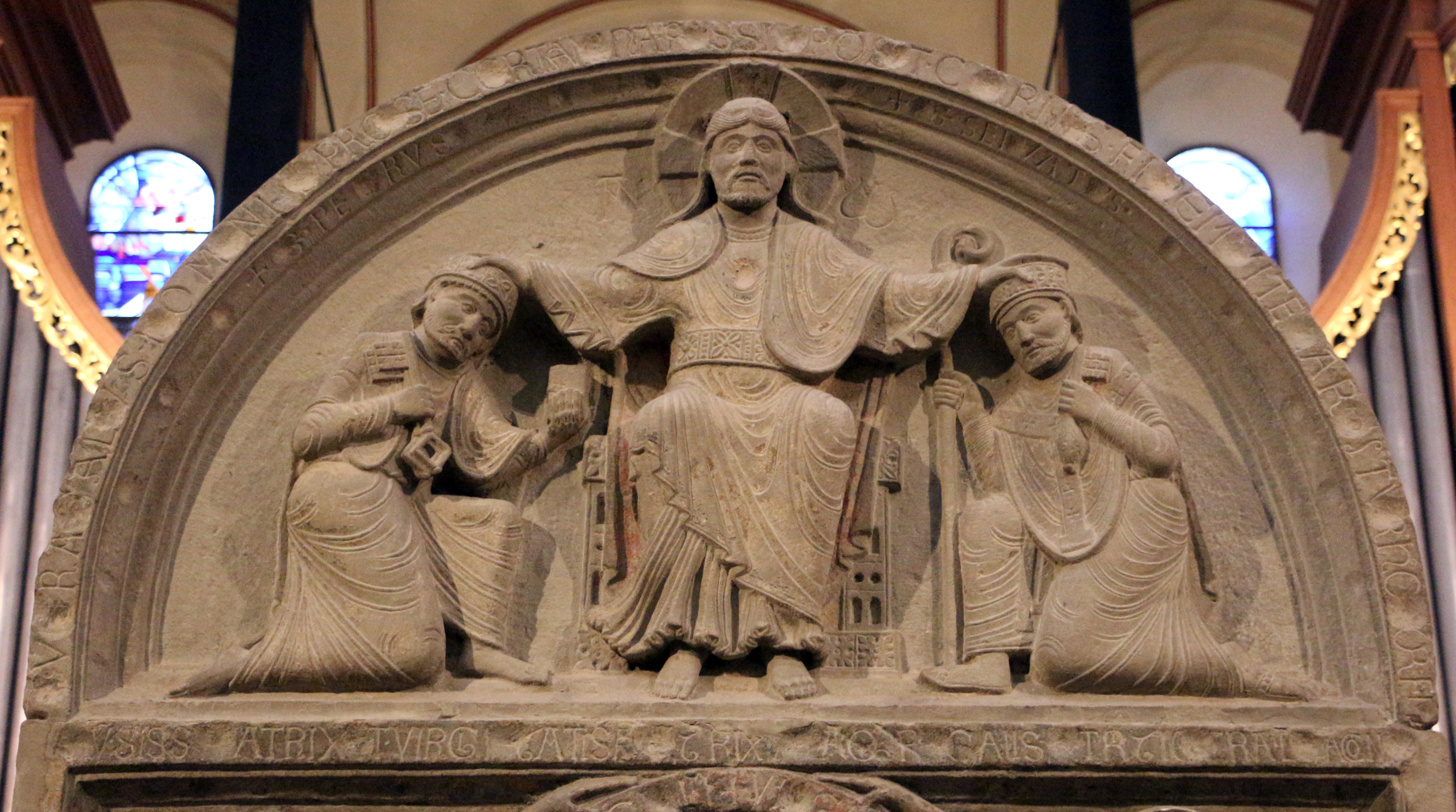
Detail of the double relief on the westwork panel (c. 1160). On the left, Saint Peter holds the keys of Peter; on the right, Saint Servatius holds the key associated with him.

One hypothesis is that the key was originally a gift from Pope Leo III to Charlemagne. The presentation by a pope to a secular ruler of a key of Saint Peter, described as a “key to the tomb of Peter”, sometimes accompanied by fragments of the apostle's chains, is documented on several occasions. Pope Leo III is said to have sent such a key to Charlemagne in 795, shortly after his accession to the papacy, as a token of allegiance. The key may subsequently have been donated to Saint Servatius' Church by Charlemagne's son, Louis the Pious, or by another ruler favourably disposed towards the collegiate church. This theory is consistent with the later medieval legend that Saint Servatius received the key directly from the apostle Peter. It is noteworthy that Peter and Servatius are depicted as equals on the so-called double relief in the church's westwork: each holds his own key, and both are crowned by Christ.

Silver-plated angel serving as a key holder (reconstruction, 1935)

The earliest accounts of the use of the Key of Saint Servatius in the liturgy and in popular piety date from around 1230. On one occasion, the key was carried over fields during a mouse infestation. It was also believed that touching the key could cure various illnesses. In the 14th century, Jean d'Outremeuse described the practice of dipping the key in water, to which healing powers were then attributed. The Ordinarius custodum, dating from around 1600, states that the key was placed on the altar every morning at ten o'clock. It rested on a support in the shape of a silver angel with outstretched arms, first mentioned around 1500 by Matthaeus Herbenus. The key was also occasionally carried in religious processions. On the feast day of Saint Servatius, 13 May, a chaplain sat beside the saint's statue in the front part of the church and blessed visitors with the key. The key was not normally among the relics displayed to the assembled pilgrims on the Vrijthof from the dwarf gallery during the Maastricht pilgrimage of relics. A French pilgrim, however, reported that it had been displayed in this way in 1510.

In 1634, the key was taken to Liège along with other valuable objects from the treasury of the collegiate church of Saint Servatius because of the threat of war. By 1654, the situation was considered safe again, and the key was returned to Maastricht. An inventory of the treasury dating from 1677 lists the object third, after the shrine of Saint Servatius and its associated gable-shaped reliquaries. The inventory also records that the key was kept in the “upper chapel” of the double chapel and was supported by a seated silver angel. (Note: The Latin text reads: 3. In Sacrario superiori asservatur insignis operis angélus argenteus, sedens ac tenens Clavem argento similem, quam Apostolorum Princeps, sanctus Petrus, sancto Servatio tradidit, dum ad limina Apostolorum Petri et Pauli missus, illic ipso Annuntiationis Deiparae festo, contra Hunnos Europani vastantes, pro Gallorum gente et Tungrensi regno preces ac lacrimas funderet, hoc signo donatus in communicatae apostolicae potestatis coelicum ac perenne testimonium. Haec Clavis aliquando furto sublata, avium indicio miraculose detecta ac recuperata, cum fracta reperiretur nec humana industria reparari potuerit, ad humiles Cleri preces divinitus consolidata est. Translation: “In the upper chapel is kept a silver angel of remarkable workmanship, seated and holding a key resembling silver. This key was given by the Prince of the Apostles, Saint Peter, to Saint Servatius when he had been sent to the tombs of the apostles Peter and Paul. There, on the feast of the Annunciation of the Virgin Mary, Servatius prayed and wept for the people of Gaul and the realm of the Tungri, threatened by the Huns ravaging Europe. He was given the key as a heavenly and everlasting sign of the apostolic authority conferred upon him. The key was once stolen, but was miraculously discovered and recovered with the help of birds. When it was found broken and could not be repaired by human skill, it was restored by divine intervention in response to the humble prayers of the clergy.” Source: Bock/Willemsen (1873), French edition, appendix, p. LVIII, no. 3.)

Following the capture of Maastricht by General Kléber in November 1794, the city's ecclesiastical institutions faced heavy war contributions. The collegiate church of Saint Servatius was consequently forced to melt down much of its gold and silver treasury. This included a silver figure of an angel that served as a key holder. The key itself survived. After the collegiate chapter was dissolved by the French authorities in late 1797, the key was entrusted to Godefridus Crutz, a 74-year-old canon. After Crutz's death, his heirs returned the key to the church sometime between 1817 and 1829. It has been kept in the church treasury ever since.

== Legend ==
The key is first described as an attribute of Saint Servatius in Jocundus's Actus Sancti Servatii, written around 1070. The earliest manuscripts relate that, after returning from Rome, Servatius showed the silver key to the people of Tongeren. Further accounts were added in the late eleventh and twelfth centuries. According to a manuscript dating from around 1150, Servatius had received the key from the apostle Peter during his stay in Rome. The key was described as clavem divine fabricationis (“of divine workmanship”). Jocundus also recounts that the key was found on the saint's body when his remains were elevated and translated during the time of Charlemagne and Saint Hubert of Liège. This chronological association is historically untenable: Hubert died in 727, whereas Charlemagne was not born until 742.

Around 1200, an account of the key's theft, miraculous return and repair was added to the Gesta Sancti Servatii. Heinrich von Veldeke had already incorporated various stories about Servatius into his Middle Dutch work Leven van Sente Servas around 1170. It is one of the earliest substantial works of Middle Dutch literature. During the Middle Ages, the key became an established attribute of the saint and is regularly shown in depictions of Servatius.

== Description ==
The Key of Saint Servatius is 29 cm long, up to 9.3 cm wide and weighs 1,046 g. It was probably made during the first decades of the ninth century, when Einhard is documented as lay abbot of the collegiate church of Saint Servatius. The key was cast in one piece from silver and subsequently gilded, although most of the gilding has since been lost. Its almond-shaped bow is hollow and pierced on both sides. The decoration consists of a wreath of acanthus scrolls and leaves, executed in openwork. The buckle-shaped upper section is cast integrally with the rest and serves to suspend the key.

The 14 cm-long bow is joined to the 8 cm-long shaft by a decorated swelling known as a nodus. The smooth shaft is octagonal and has a round pinhole at its lower end. The bit is approximately square, measuring 4.7 × 5.4 cm. On each side it has four recesses and five openings arranged in the form of a Jerusalem cross, consisting of a large Greek cross surrounded by four smaller crosses.

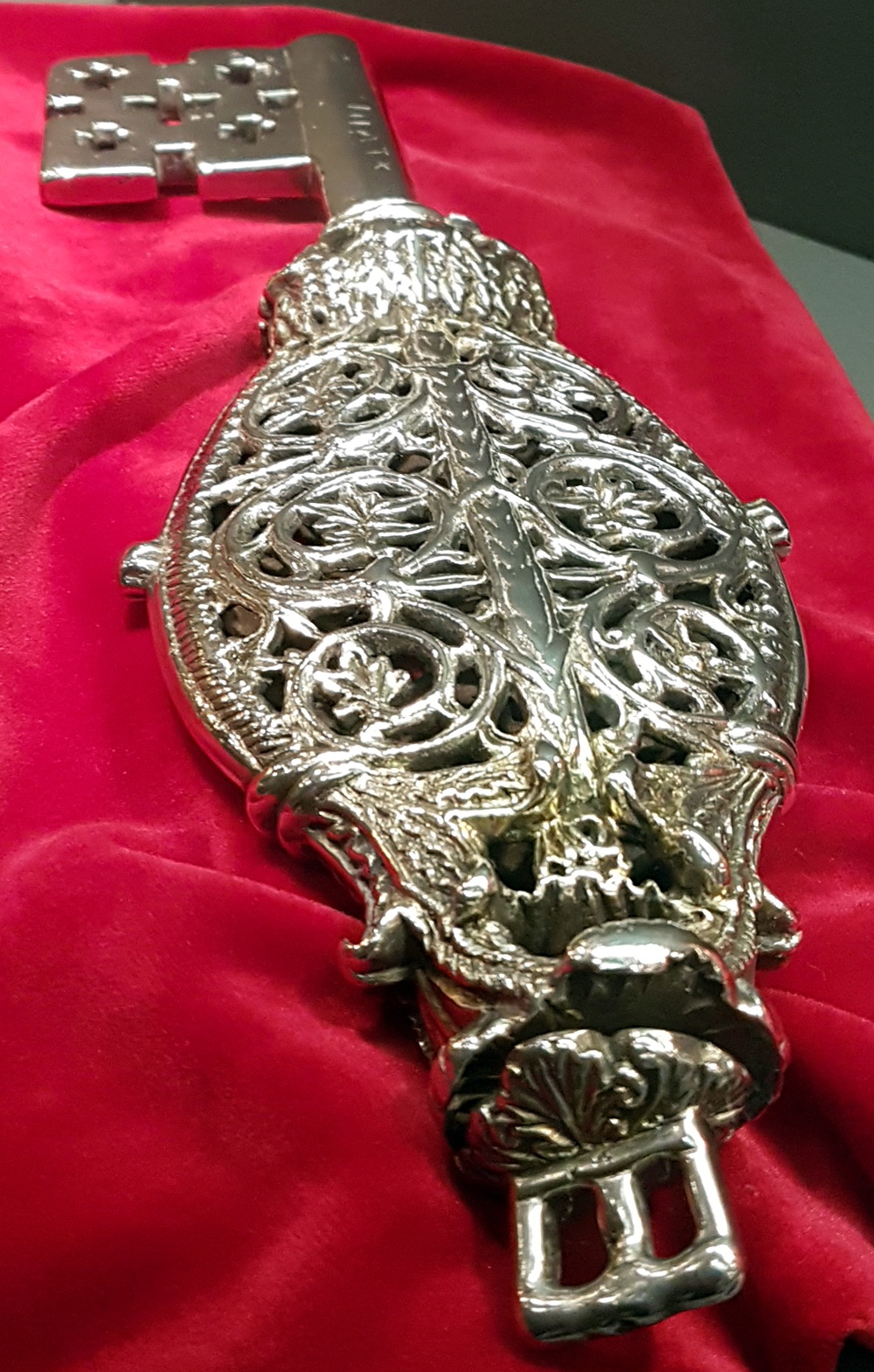
The key during the Maastricht Pilgrimage of the Relics

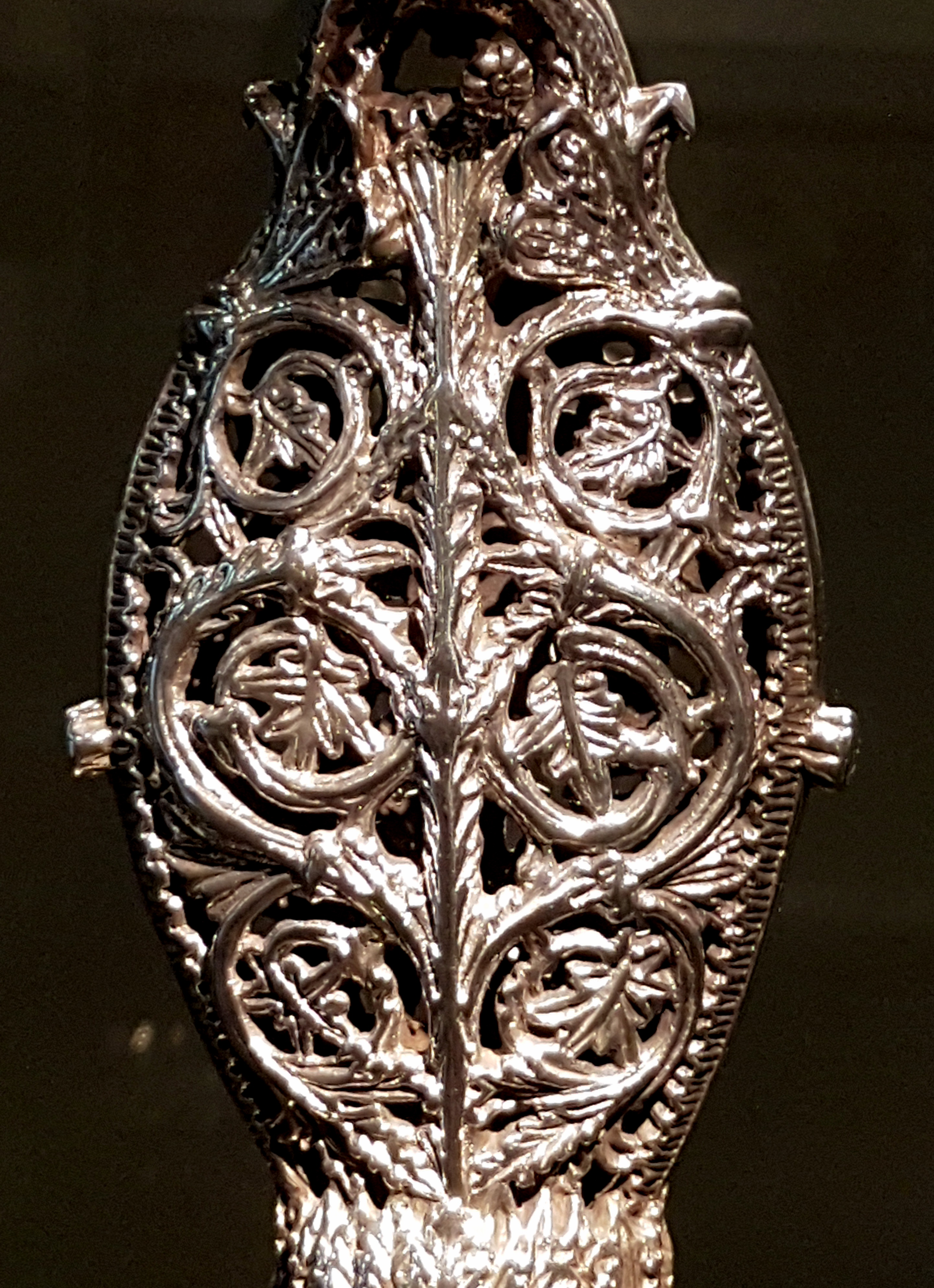
Detail of the bow

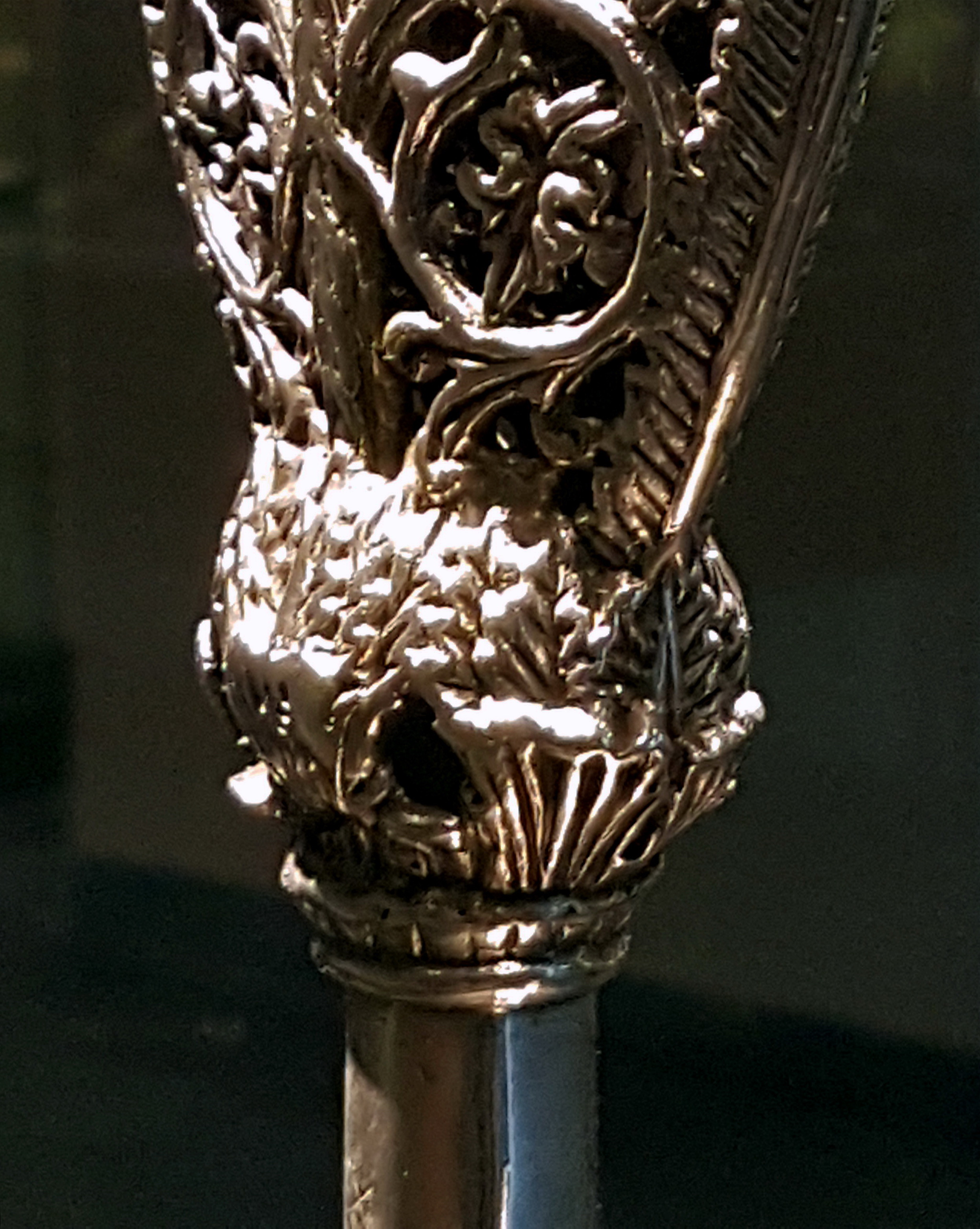
Nodus and shaft

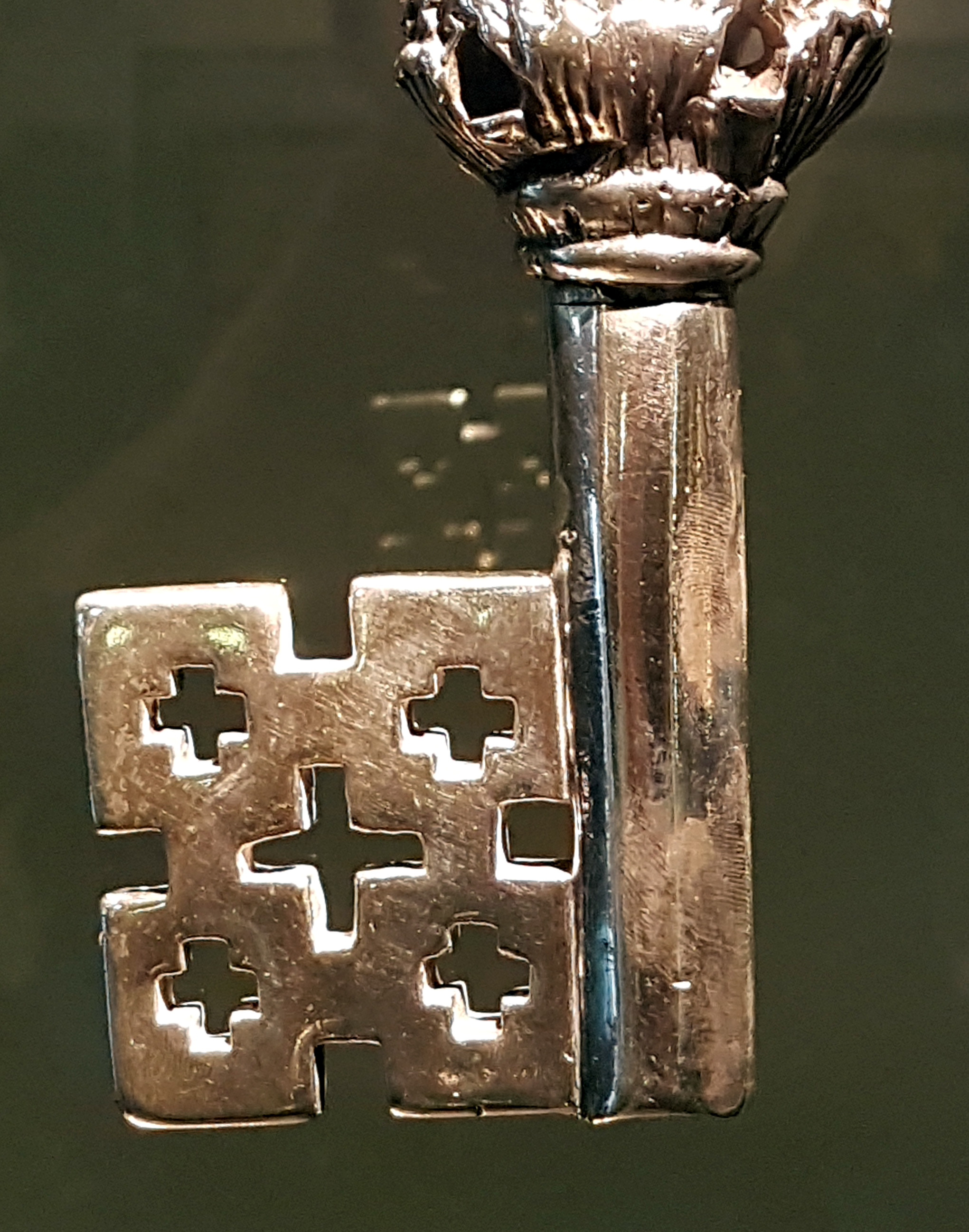
The bit

== Symbolism ==
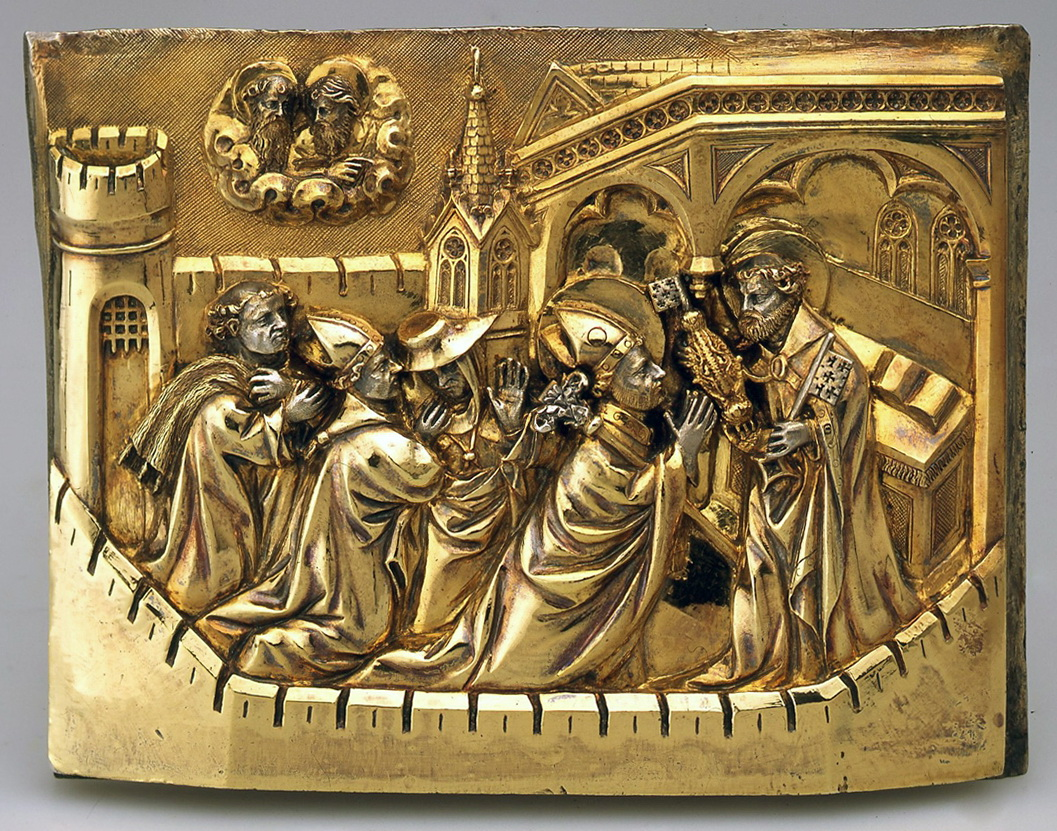
Saint Servatius receives the key from Saint Peter, who himself holds the Keys of Peter. Silver relief, originally part of the bust reliquary of Saint Servatius, now in the Museum für Kunst und Gewerbe in Hamburg

Koldeweij interprets the four acanthus scrolls growing upwards on the bow of the key as an allegory of the Tree of the Knowledge of Good and Evil in Paradise. He also understands them as a representation of the lignum vitae, or Tree of Life, as described in 815 by the Aachen court scholar Rabanus Maurus: Christ as the living wood of the Cross. According to this interpretation, the twelve acanthus rosettes also symbolise the Tree of Jesse and the Twelve Tribes of Israel, representing the people of Israel and the history of salvation. The five crosses on the bit represent the five wounds of Christ on the Cross. For Rabanus Maurus, the key is Christ himself: “clavis est Christus” (“Christ is the key”). Koldeweij also identifies the Maastricht key with the clavis Davidis, or Key of David. Charlemagne was described by members of his circle as novus David (“a new David”). The comparison with the Old Testament king David played a role in royal coronation ceremonies for many centuries, and was associated with the symbolism of the Key of David.

The silver key in the Church of Saint Servatius was not attributed to Saint Servatius until the second half of the eleventh century. From that time onwards, its Old Testament symbolism gradually receded into the background. Its symbolic interpretation shifted towards the clavis Petri, the Key of Heaven, which according to legend Servatius had received from the apostle Peter in Rome, and the ecclesiastical authority associated with it.

The symbolic significance attributed to the key led to its inclusion in the coat of arms of the collegiate chapter of Saint Servatius. An inn within the chapter's immunity precinct, next to the chapter brewery and on the site of what is now Maternushof, was called In den Sleutel (“At the Key”). Today, the key can still be found on numerous objects and in various locations in and around the Basilica of Saint Servatius. Examples include the old and new bells named Grameer; the cloaks worn by members of the association “Het graf van Sint-Servaas” (see Pilgrimage of the Relics, Maastricht); a surviving boundary marker of the chapter's immunity precinct at Sint Servaasklooster; and the street lamps on the Vrijthof. Through the eleven judicial districts administered by the collegiate chapter of Saint Servatius, the key also became part of the coats of arms of the former municipalities of Heer, Cadier en Keer, and Berg en Terblijt. Through the coat of arms of Berg en Terblijt, it also appears in the arms of the present-day municipality of Valkenburg aan de Geul.

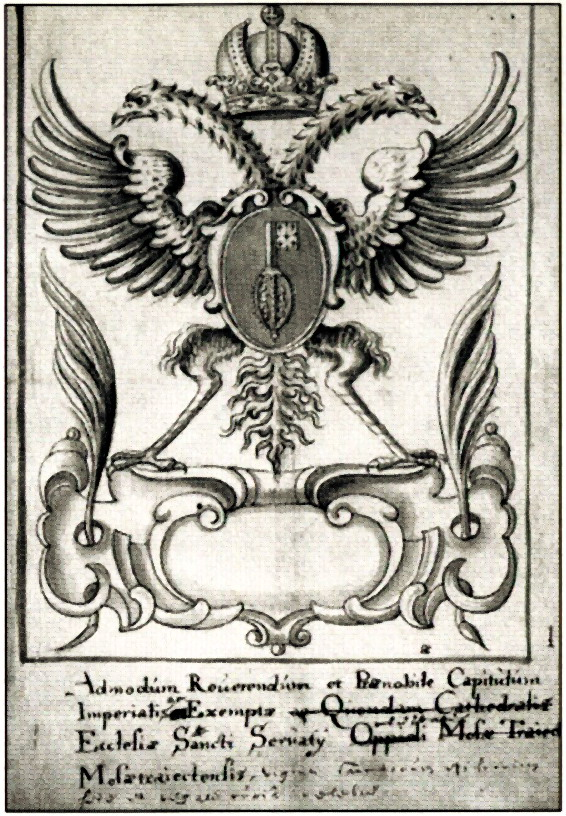
Coat of arms of the collegiate chapter of Saint Servatius (eighteenth-century engraving)

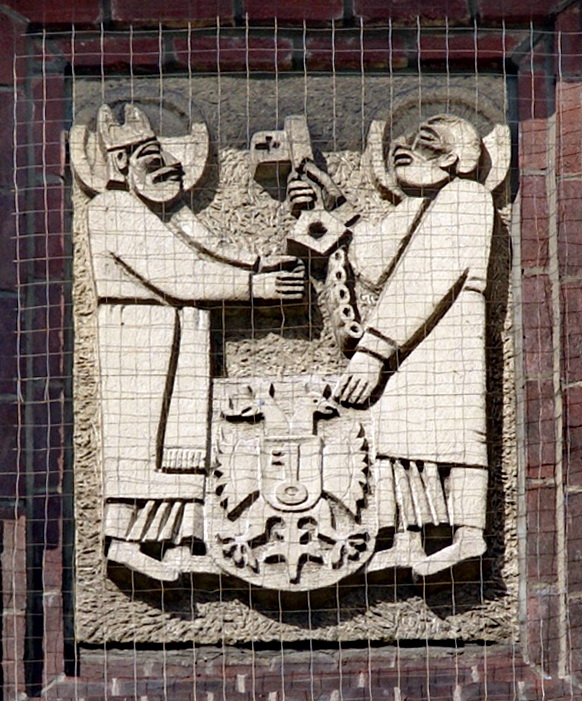
Coat of arms of the former municipality of Heer

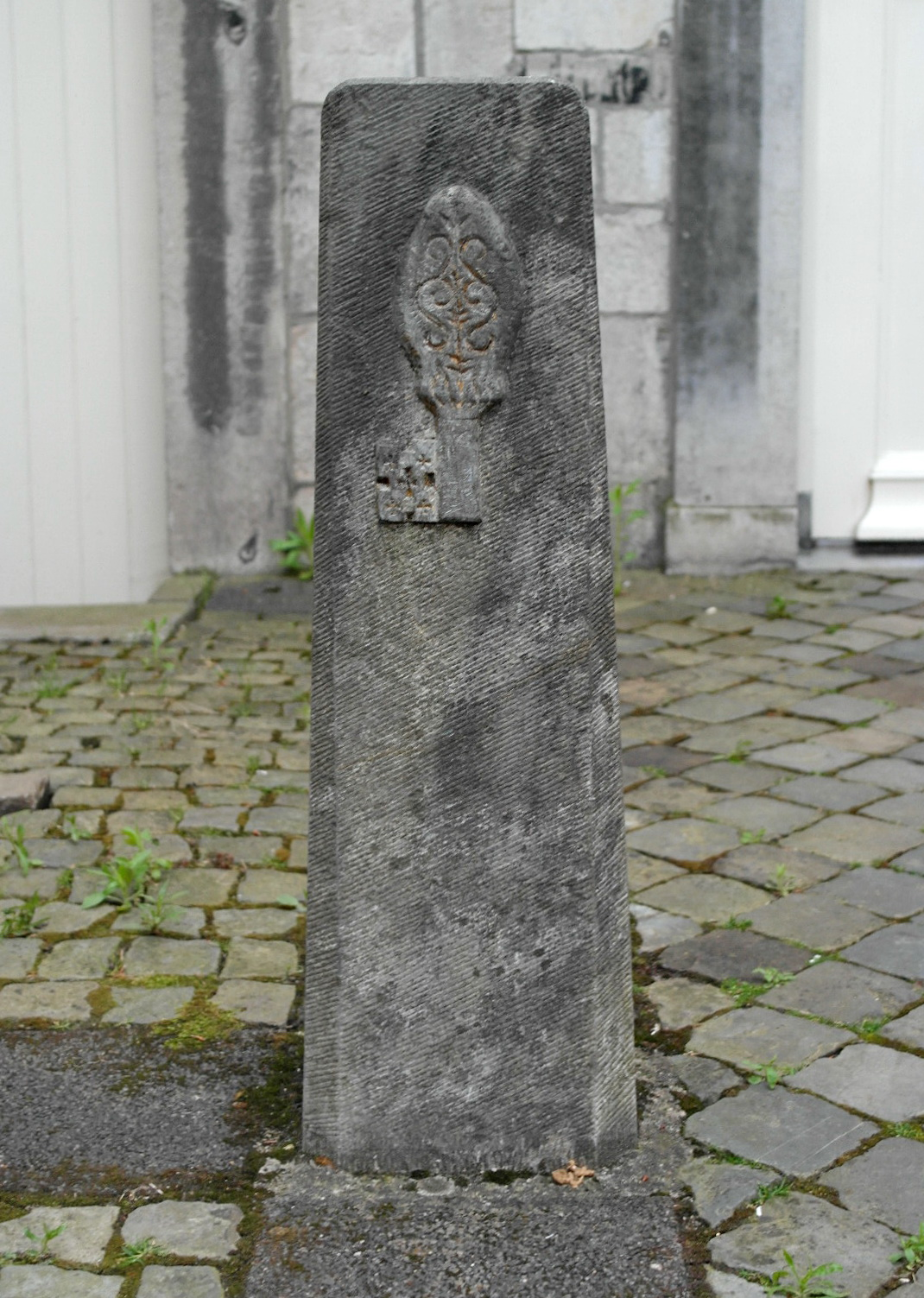
Boundary marker of the immunity precinct of the collegiate chapter of Saint Servatius

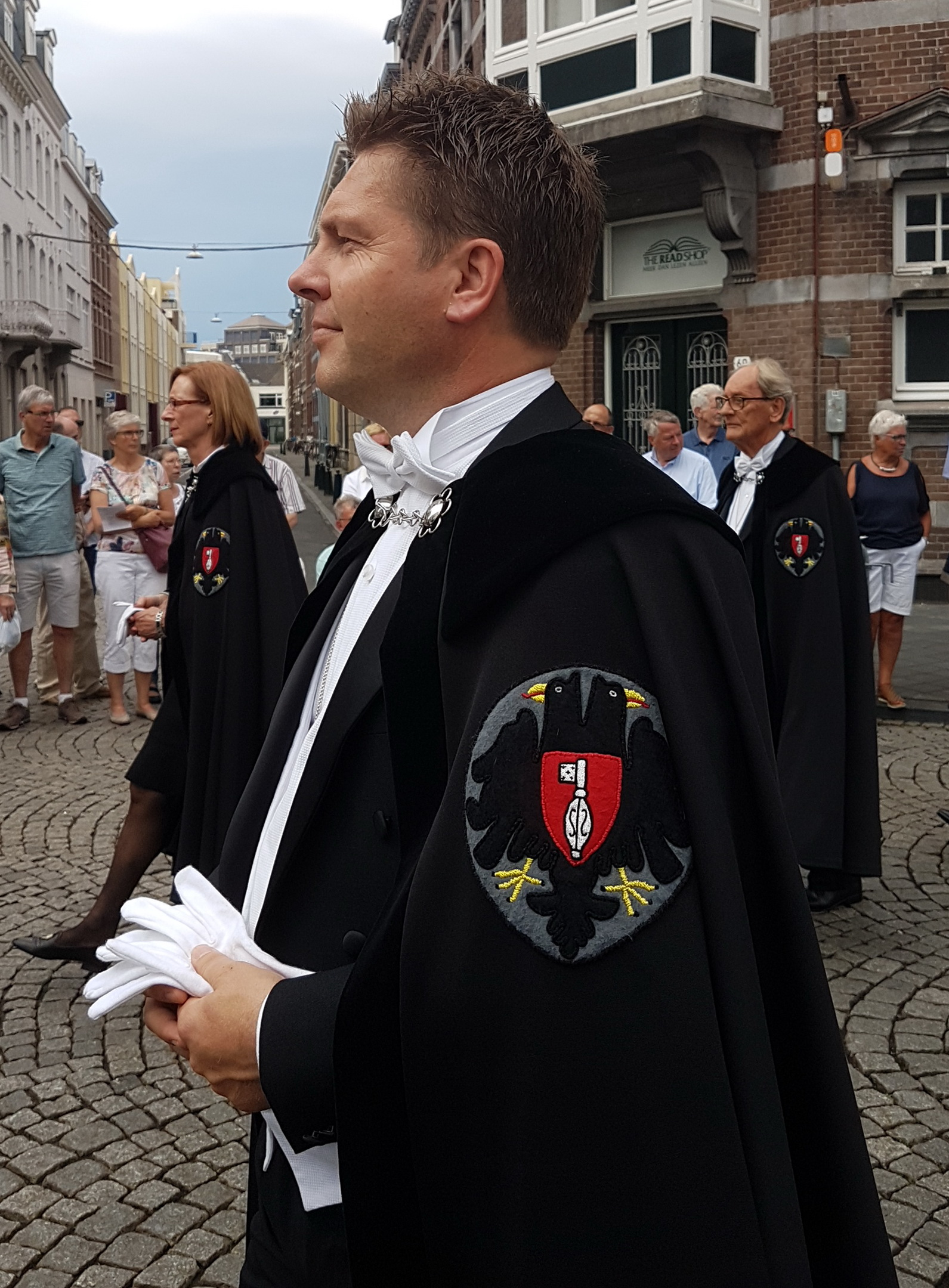
Clothing worn by members of the association “Het graf van Sint-Servaas”

== Art-historical comparisons ==
Balustrade of the Palatine Chapel, Aachen

Detail of the Carolingian bronze balustrade grilles: handrail and capital

In terms of material, technique and design, the Key of Saint Servatius bears strong similarities to several other objects attributed to a workshop in Aachen. Koldeweij identifies as the closest parallel a cast, chased and gilded silver ornamental pin from Häljarp, Sweden. Decorated with niello, it is now held at the Historical Museum in Lund. Other comparable objects include the Lebuinus Chalice from the Broerenkerk in Deventer, now in the Museum Catharijneconvent in Utrecht; the golden ewer of Charlemagne at Saint-Maurice Abbey in the Swiss canton of Valais; and the cast bronze balustrade grilles on the upper level of the Palatine Chapel, Aachen, in Aachen Cathedral.

A. M. Koldeweij has discussed in detail the similarities in the acanthus-leaf motif, which derives from Classical antiquity. The motif appears on the Key of Saint Servatius and the Swedish ornamental pin; on the ivory component of the Lebuinus Chalice, whose silver fittings were added later; on the ewer of Charlemagne, particularly its handle and the rim of its spout; and on the grilles of the Palatine Chapel in Aachen, especially parts of the handrail and several capitals. These similarities allow the Key of Saint Servatius to be associated with a group of artists active in Aachen, in the vicinity of the royal palace, during the first decades of the ninth century.

An object that has relatively few stylistic similarities to the Key of Saint Servatius, but is closely related to it in form and function, is the Key of Saint Hubert in the Treasury of Liège Cathedral. It should not be confused with a so-called Saint Hubert's Key, a ritual object used in the treatment of rabies. The Liège key dates from the twelfth or thirteenth century and likewise has a relatively large, openwork bow and a bit with cross-shaped openings. This key, too, is associated with the apostle Peter: fragments of the chains with which Peter was bound in his prison in Rome are said to be contained in its bow. According to tradition, an angel broke these chains. It is not known whether the Maastricht key also contained such relics.

Ornamental pin from Häljarp, Lund

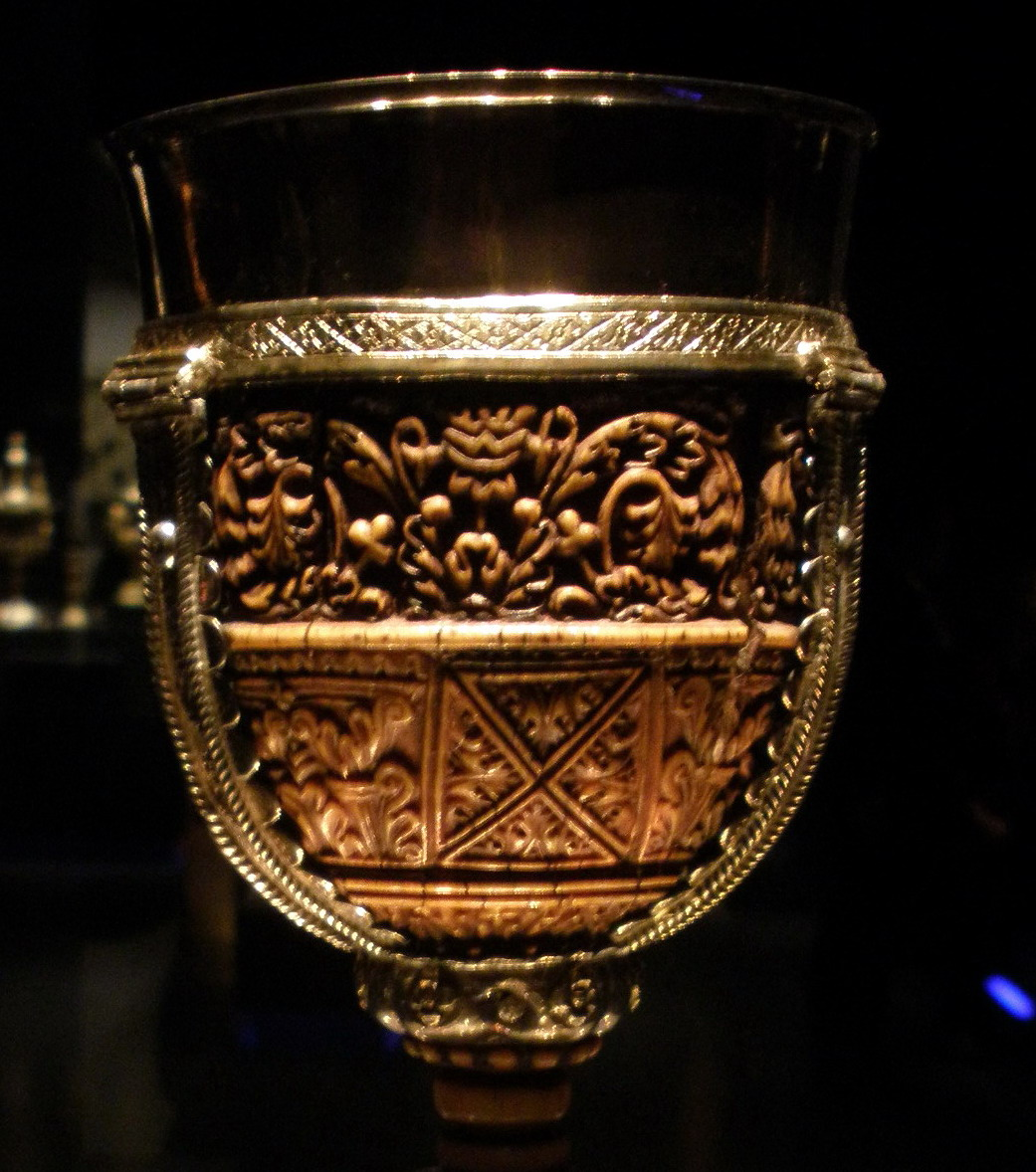
Lebuinus Chalice, Utrecht

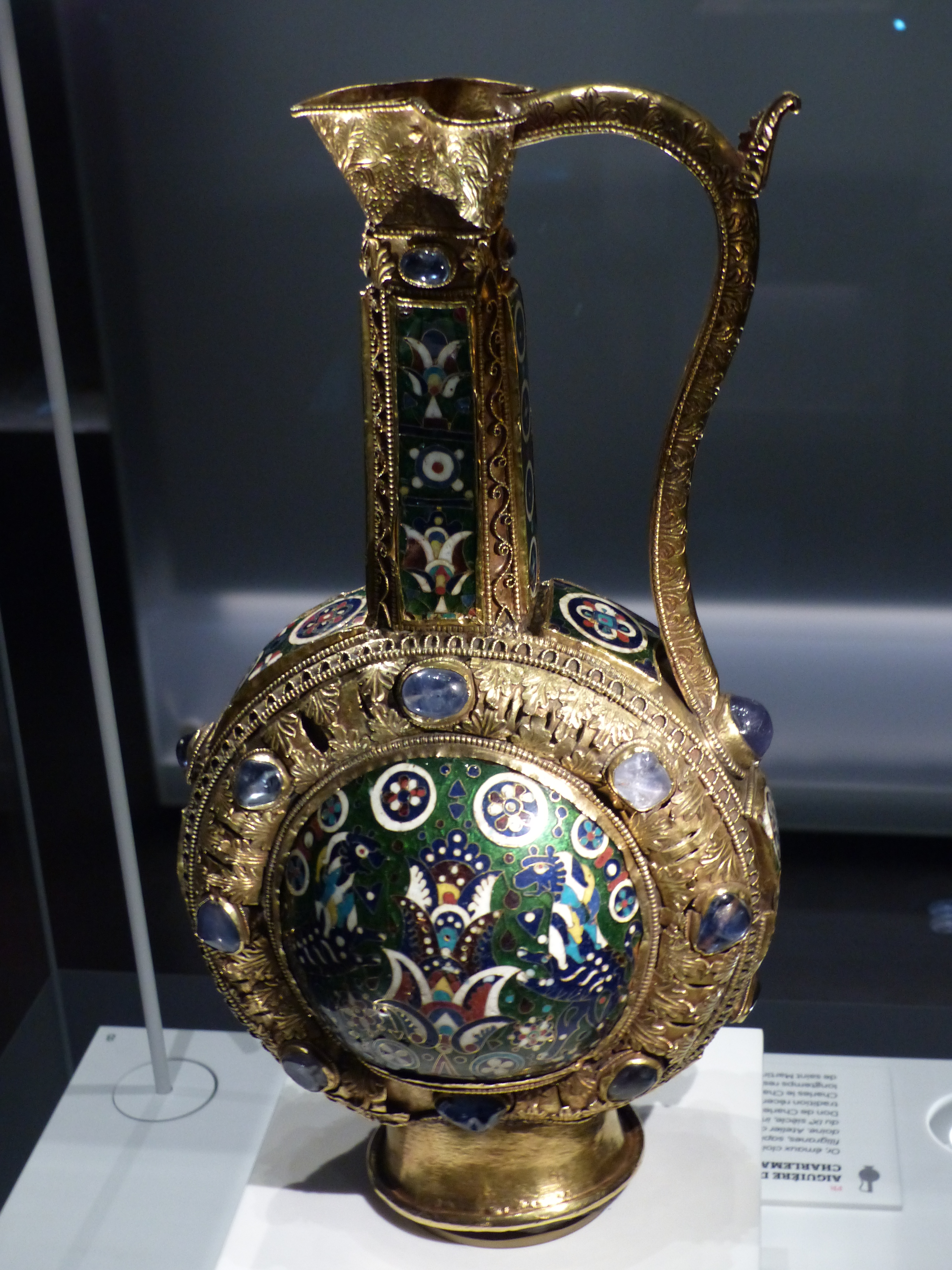
Ewer of Charlemagne, Saint-Maurice Abbey

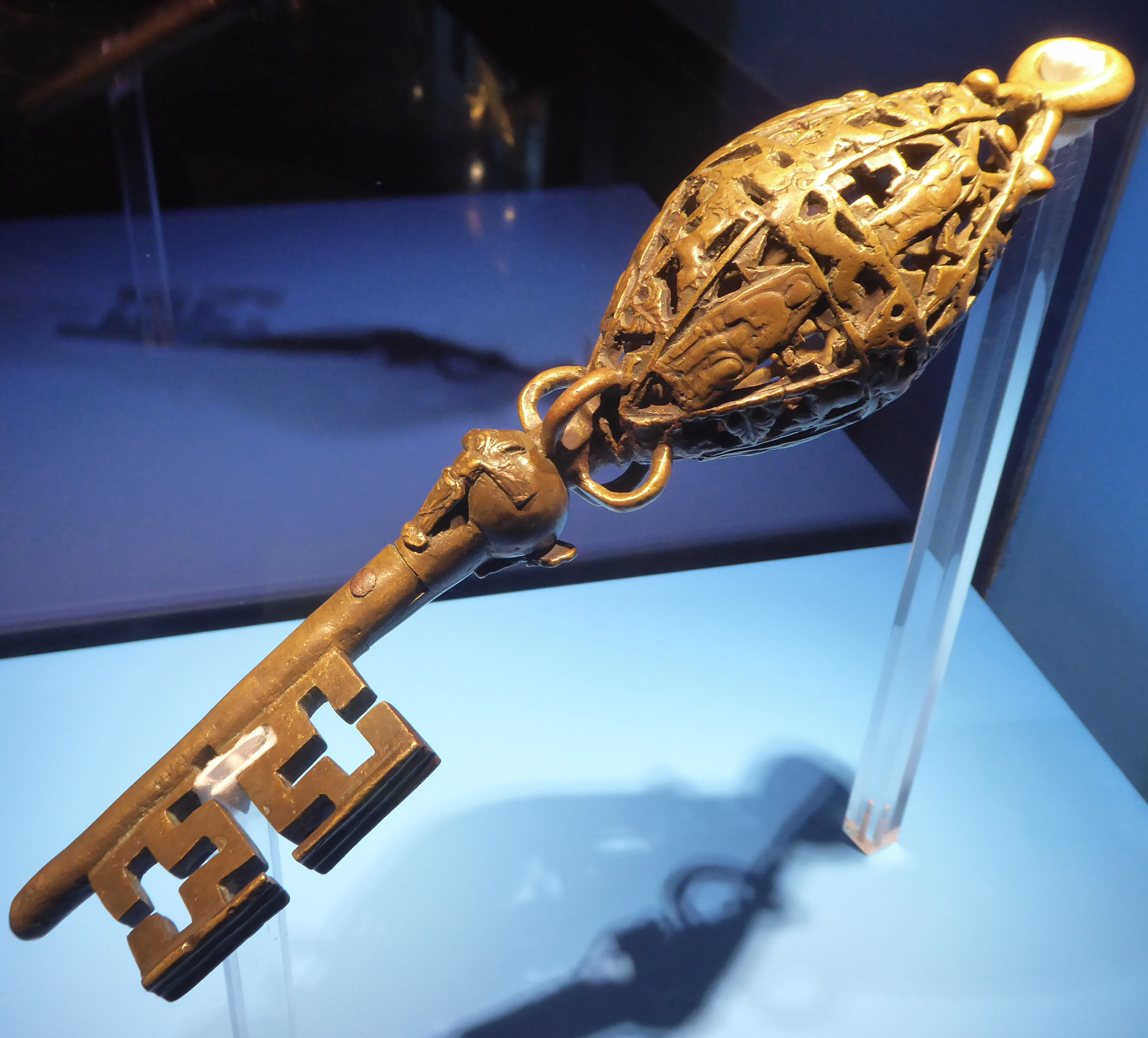
Key of Saint Hubert, Liège

== See also ==
- Treasury of the Basilica of Saint Servatius
- Shrine of Saint Servatius
- Bust of Saint Servatius
- Ardennes Cross

== Bibliography ==
- (German, French, Dutch) Bock, Franz, and Michaël Willemsen (1872/1873/1874). Die mittelalterlichen Kunst- und Reliquienschätze zu Maestricht, aufbewahrt in den ehemaligen Stiftskirchen des h. Servatius und Unserer Lieben Frau daselbst, usw. / Antiquités sacrées conservées dans les anciennes collégiales de S. Servais et de Notre-Dame à Maestricht, etc. / Het heiligdom van St. Servaas-kerk te Maastricht. Trilingual bound edition. Maastricht / Cologne and Neuss. German edition online; French edition online.
- (Dutch) Koldeweij, A. M. (1985). Der gude Sente Servas. Maaslandse Monografieën, vol. 5. Van Gorcum, Assen and Maastricht. ISBN 90-232-2119-2. Online text.
- (German) Kroos, Renate (1985). Der Schrein des heiligen Servatius in Maastricht und die vier zugehörigen Reliquiare in Brüssel. Veröffentlichungen des Zentralinstituts für Kunstgeschichte in München, vol. VII. Deutscher Kunstverlag, Munich. ISBN 3-422-00772-5.
- (Dutch) Mekking, Aart (1986). De Sint-Servaaskerk te Maastricht. Bijdragen tot de kennis van de symboliek en de geschiedenis van de bouwdelen en de bouwsculptuur tot ca. 1200. Revised dissertation. Clavis Kunsthistorische Monografieën, vol. II. De Walburg Pers, Zutphen. ISBN 90-6011-339-X.
- (Dutch) Panhuysen, Titus (2011a). “Sleutelfiguren uit de vroegste geschiedenis van de Sint-Servaasabdij van Maastricht”. Publications (PSHAL 147), pp. 9–62. Limburgs Geschied- en Oudheidkundig Genootschap, Maastricht. ISSN 0167-6652. Online text.
- (German) Panhuysen, Titus (2011b): “Wendepunkte in der Frühgeschichte der Maastrichter Servatiusabtei”. T. Panhuysen (ed.), Transformations in North-Western Europe (AD 300-1000). Proceedings of the 60th Sachsensymposium 19–23 September 2009 Maastricht, pp. 67–89. Neue Studien zur Sachsenforschung 3. Hannover. Online text.
- (Dutch) Theuws, Frans (2003): De sleutel van Sint Servaas. Uitwisseling, religie, identiteit en centrale plaatsen in de Vroege Middeleeuwen (inaugural lecture University of Amsterdam, March 28, 2003). Vossiuspers UvA, Amsterdam. ISBN 9056293001. Online text.
- (Dutch)Ubachs, Pierre J. H., and Ingrid M. H. Evers (2005). Historische Encyclopedie Maastricht. Walburg Pers, Zutphen / Regionaal Historisch Centrum Limburg, Maastricht. ISBN 90-5730-399-X.
