= Servatius of Tongeren =

Catholic and Eastern Orthodox saint

Saint Servatius
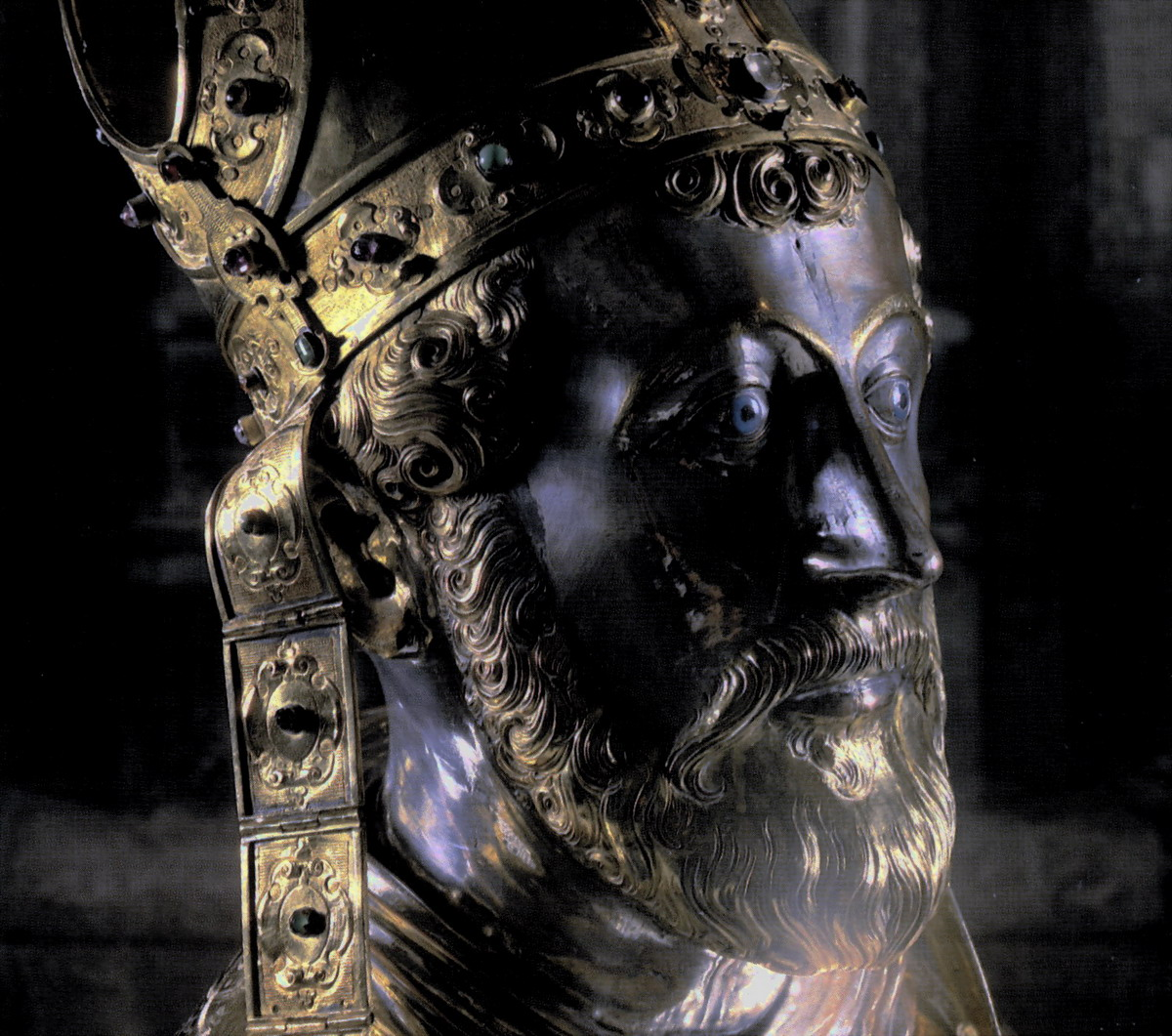
- Bust of Saint Servatius (1400s/1580s)
- Born: Unknown; Armenia (traditionally)
- Died: 13 May 384 AD (traditionally); Maastricht
- Venerated in: Catholic Church; Eastern Orthodox Church
- Major shrine: Shrine of Saint Servatius, Basilica of Saint Servatius, Maastricht
- Feast: 13 May
- Attributes: So-called "Key of Saint Servatius", crozier, dragon (under his feet)
- Patronage: Invoked against: foot troubles, lameness, rheumatism, rats and mice

Saint Servatius (Dutch: Sint Servaas; French: Saint Servais; Limburgish: Sintervaos; died 13 May 384) was bishop of Tongeren. Servatius is patron saint of the city of Maastricht and the towns of Schijndel and Grimbergen. His feast day is 13 May and he is one of the Ice Saints whose feast days fall in mid May.

== History ==
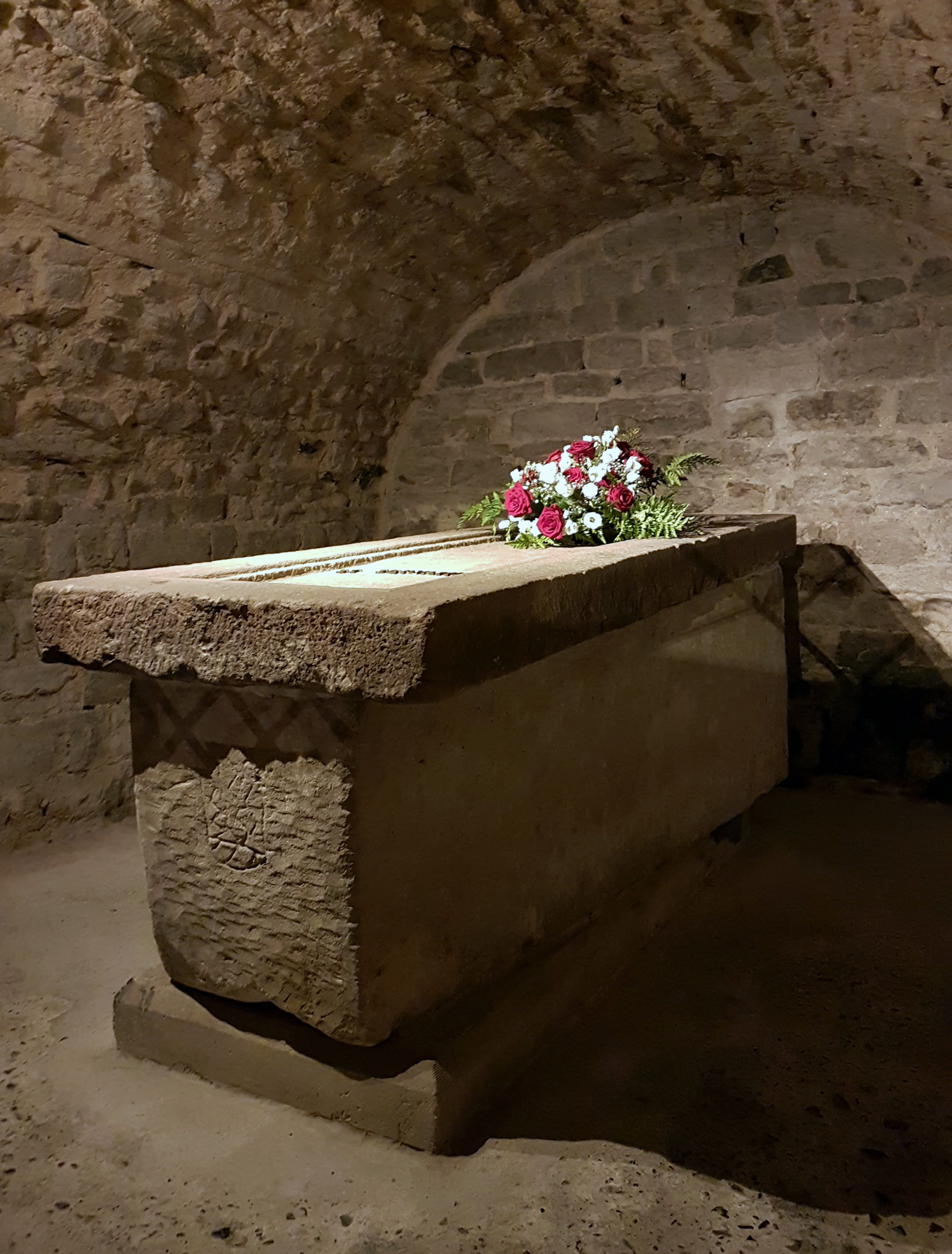
Tomb of Saint Servatius in the Basilica of Saint Servatius in Maastricht

A widely travelled diplomat and a determined opponent of Arianism, the presence of Servatius is recorded at several synods and church councils. In 343, Sarbatios - Greek texts rendering v as b - was present at the Council of Sardica (modern Sofia). In the debates, Servatius represented the Trinitarian view, which clashed with the Arian view of most Eastern bishops. According to Sulpicius Severus, Servatius again eloquently denounced Arianism at the Council of Rimini in 359.

When Athanasius, the leading opponent of Arianism, was exiled to Trier (in 336 or 343), he may have met with Servatius, because both men campaigned against Arian bishops and priests in the region.

According to a medieval legend, Servatius took part a Council of Cologne in 346, testifying that Euphrates, bishop of Cologne, "denied the divinity of Jesus Christ, this even happened in the presence of Athanasius, bishop of Alexandria". Euphrates was historically known as an opponent of Arianism and alongside Athanasius and Servatius took part in the Council of Sardica. The legend, compiled in Trier, probably aimed at reducing the status of the church of Cologne, with which Trier was in conflict over ecclesiastical predominance.

After co-emperor Constans had been assassinated in 350, Servatius was sent to the Roman emperor Constantius II in Edessa, the capital of Armenian Mesopotamia, as an envoy of the usurper Magnentius to represent the late Constans as an unworthy tyrant and oppressor, in the hope of obtaining Constantius's recognition of Magnentius as co-ruler. The mission failed and the resulting civil war ended with the death of Magnentius in 353. The mission can be seen as a sign of the high standing of Servatius.

=== Servatius and the Huns ===
An important source about the life of Saint Servatius, albeit not a contemporary source, is Gregory of Tours's Glory of the Confessors and History of the Franks. In his late 6th-century account, Gregory writes about Aravatius (identified by most scholars as Servatius), who was a bishop of Tongeren (Latin: Atuatuca Tungrorum, the capital of the Tungri) and died in Maastricht. According to the Frankish bishop and historian, Aravatius lived at the time when the Huns threatened Tongeren (5th century), which does not match the 4th-century dates of the synods mentioned above. It is not always clear how much of Gregory's account is history and how much is fiction. Gregory describes how Aravatius, during a vigil at Saint Peter's tomb in Rome, had a vision in which the destruction of Tongeren was forecast (because of their sinfulness). Peter then handed the Keys of Heaven to Aravatius, transferring to him the power to forgive sins. According to Gregory, Aravatius returned to Tongeren, brought the relics of his predecessors to Maastricht, where he died and was buried alongside the Roman road, near the bridge.

As a bishop, Servatius may have been the founder of several early Christian churches in the diocese of Tongeren. Two likely candidates are the Basilica of Our Lady in Tongeren and the Basilica of Our Lady in Maastricht. In the case of Tongeren, this traditional claim was supported by excavations in the 1980s, which revealed under the medieval church remains of a 4th-century church, possibly the original cathedral of the diocese. The origins of the Maastricht church of Our Lady remain uncertain, since no excavations have ever been carried out inside this church. In another Maastricht church however, the Basilica of Saint Servatius, excavations in the 1990s have revealed the remains of a 6th-century church (built by bishop Monulph and described by Gregory of Tours as a magnum templum), with at its center a late Roman structure, possibly the tomb of Servatius.

== Legend ==
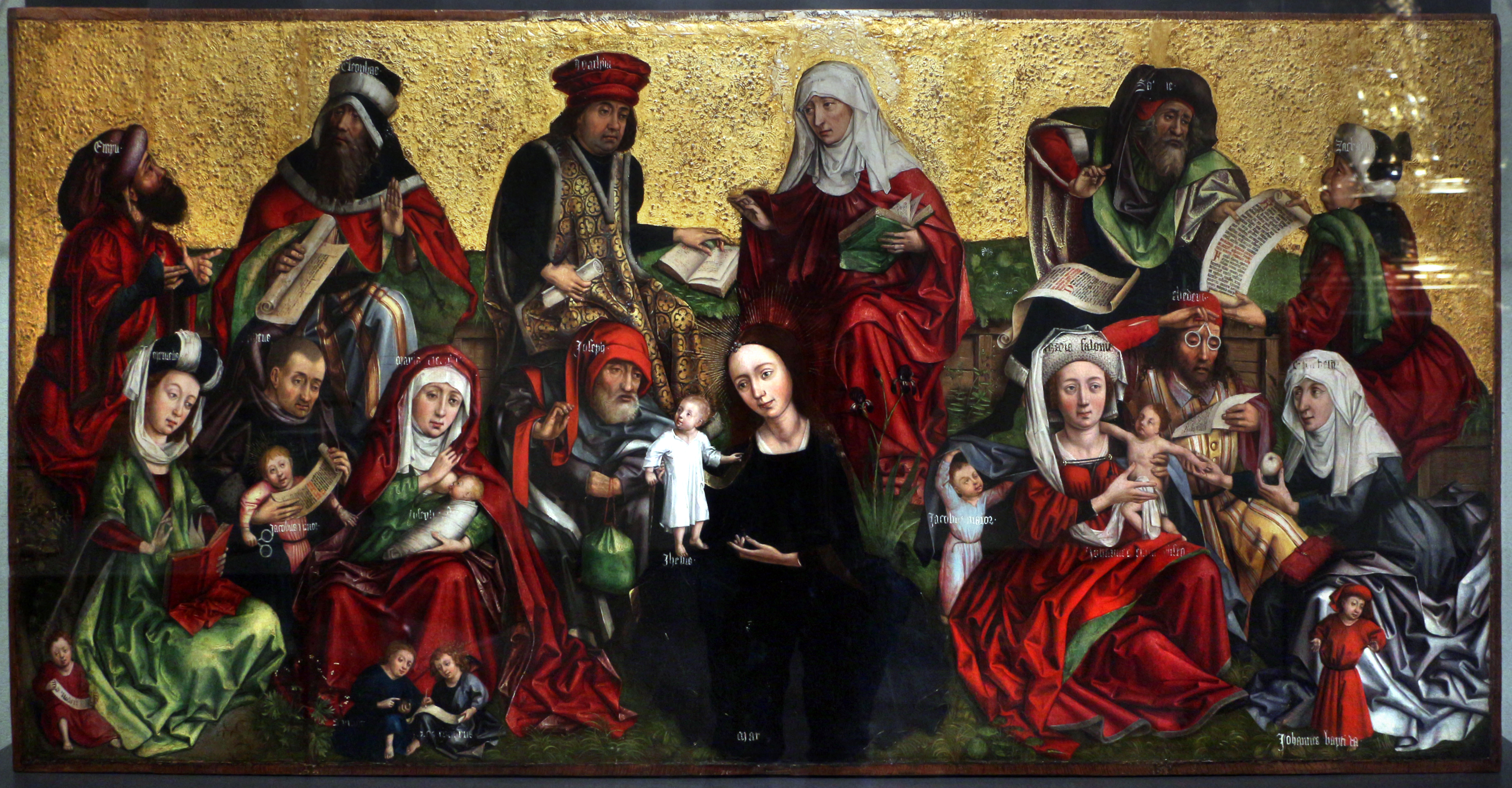
The extended family of Saint Servatius, including Jesus, Mary, John the Baptist and Saint Anne (16th-century panel, Treasury of the Basilica of Saint Servatius)

Over the centuries legends accumulated around the historical figure of the bishop of Tongeren. Two early vitae (hagiographies) place Servatius's birth in Armenia and make him a cousin of John the Baptist, and thus a distant relative of Jesus (neither were mentioned by Gregory of Tours).

Around 1075, the French priest Jocundus was commissioned by the chapter of Saint Servatius to write another Vita sancti Servatii. Jocundus is also the author of the Miracula sancti Servatii, a sequel to the vita, describing all the miracles that happened after Servatius's death. According to some historians, both works were composed to quell doubts about the genealogy of Servatius and his Armenian descent. These doubts had been raised at the Council of Mainz in 1049. When envoys from the Byzantine emperor arrived at the Council of Mainz, confirming accounts by a certain Alagrecus who had testified that Servatius was Armenian, and asserting that his birthplace was Fenuste, southeast of Damascus, this helped to erase some doubts but Servatius's kinship to Jesus was never confirmed by an official council.

At the end of the 12th century the poet Henric van Veldeke wrote a new legend of Saint Servatius, based on the earlier accounts by Gregory of Tours and Jocundus, to which he added several more miracles, thus emphasizing Saint Servatius's saintliness. The work is considered one of the earliest works of Dutch literature, even though it was written in Limburgish, the most divergent of the four major dialects that comprises Middle Dutch.

In the 17th century, the Bollandists tried to separate some of the facts and myths surrounding Servatius. They managed to calculate the exact date of his death (13 May 384), which for a long time was accepted as a historical fact.

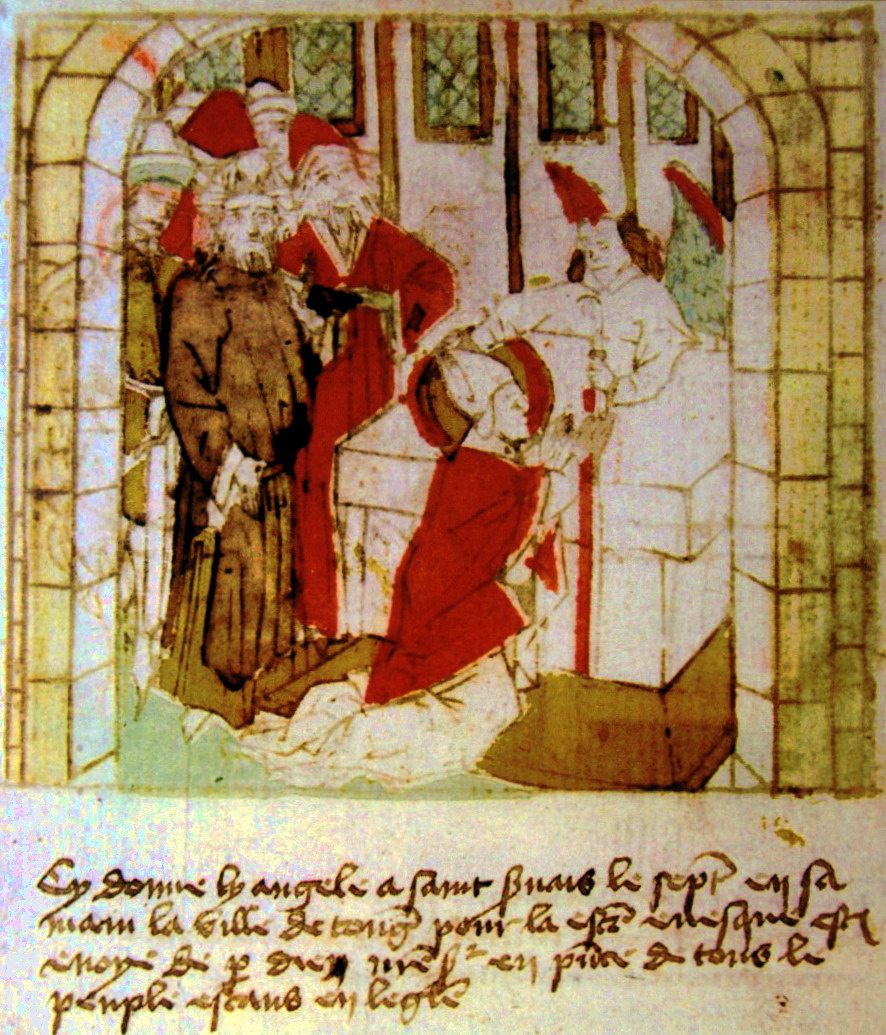
Saint Servatius receives in Tongeren the mitre and crozier from an angel

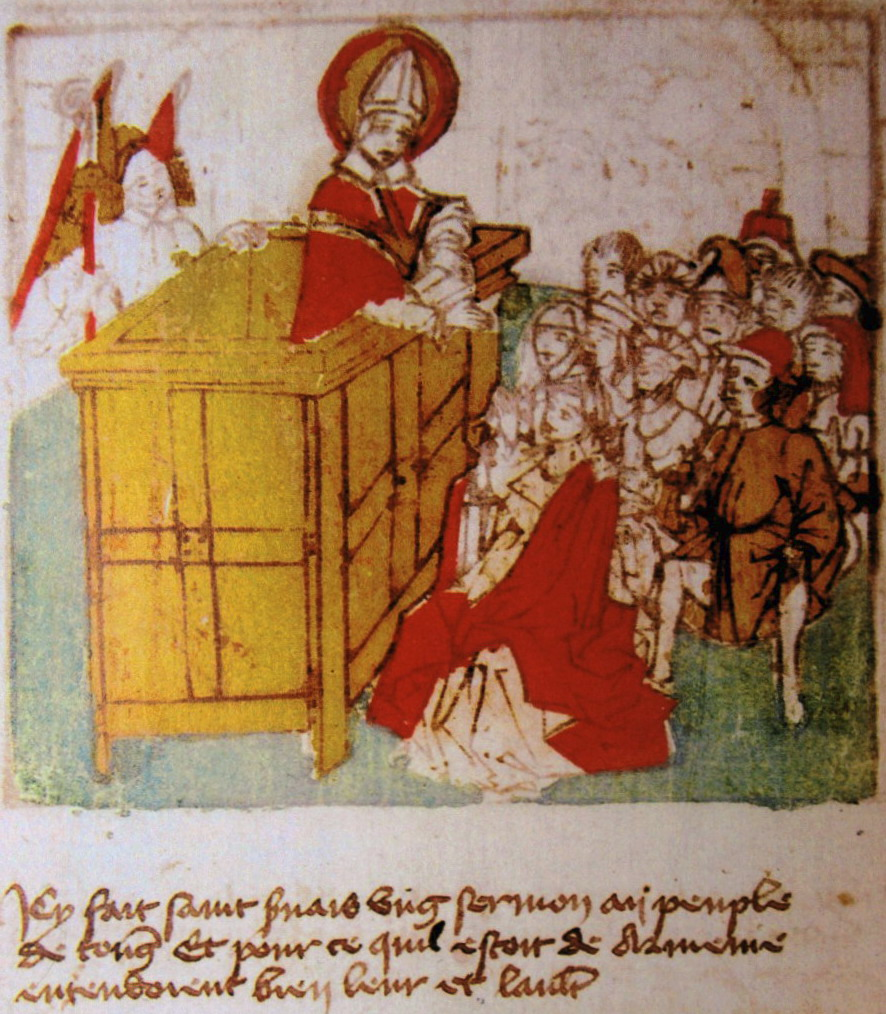
Saint Servatius preaches in Greek. The audience miraculously understands him

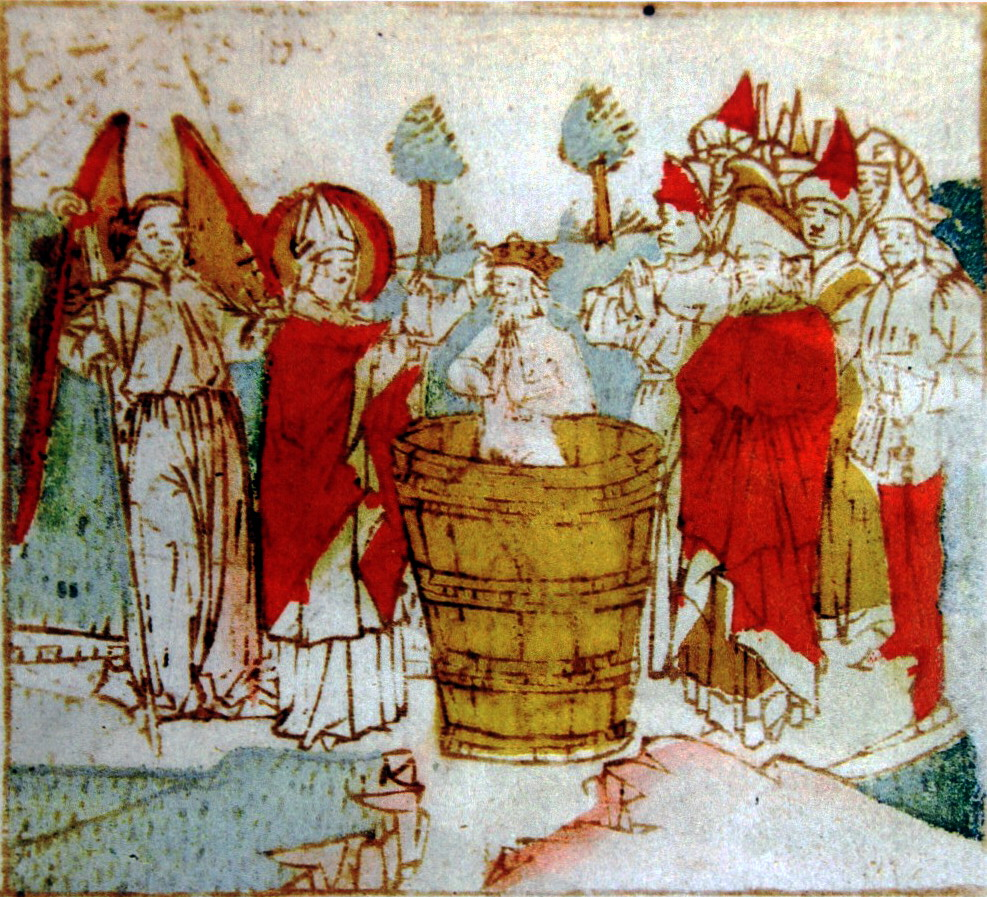
Saint Servatius baptizes Attila the Hun

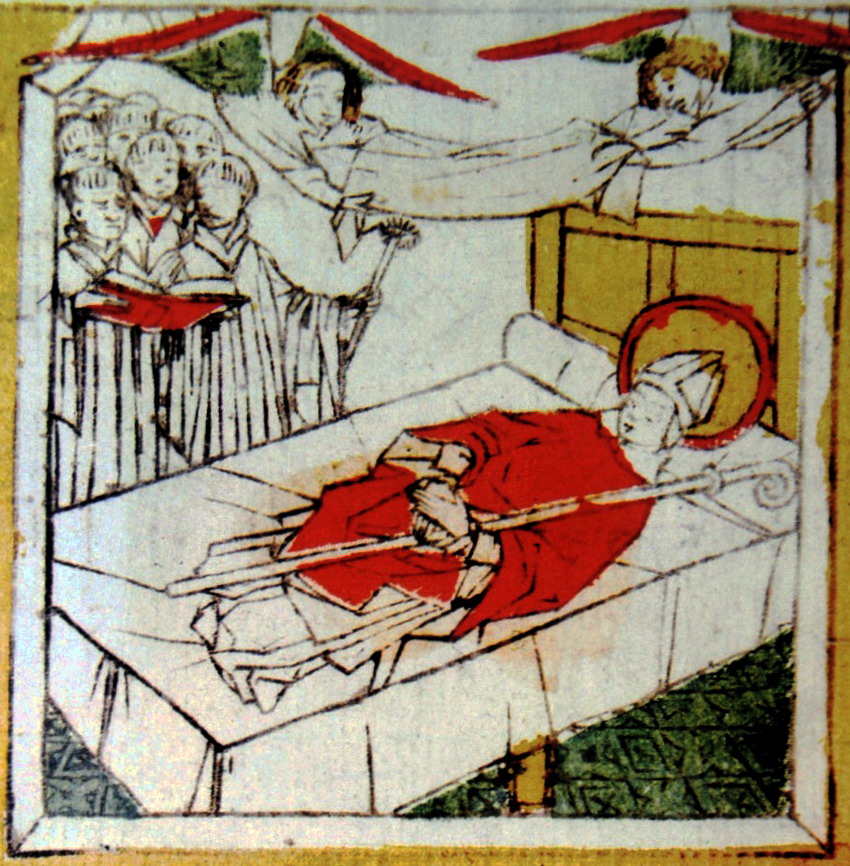
Saint Servatius dies in Maastricht. Angels cover his body with 'heavenly cloths'

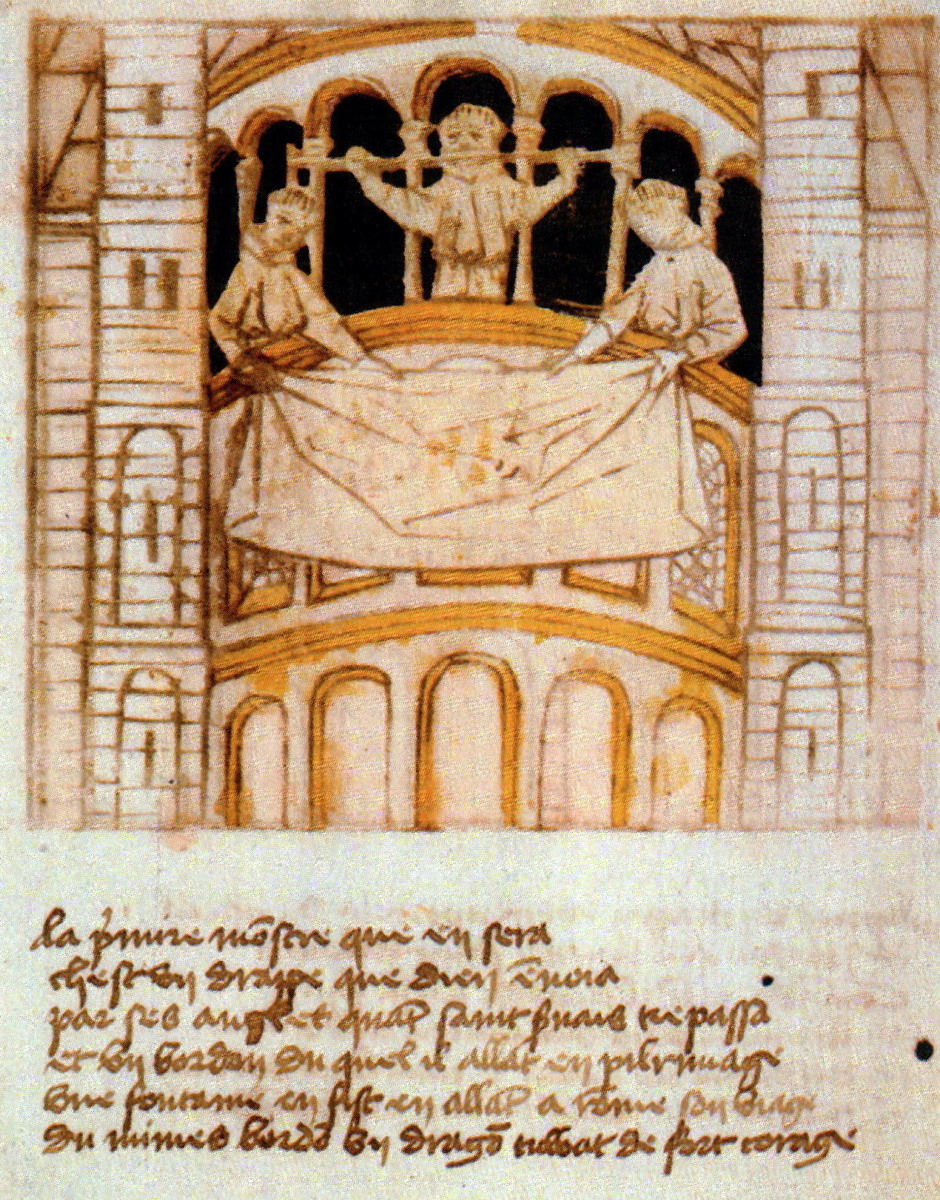
One of the 'heavenly cloths' shown to pilgrims from the dwarf gallery of the Basilica of Saint Servatius

== Legacy ==
=== In Maastricht ===
According to tradition the saint's remains are buried in the Basilica of Saint Servatius in Maastricht, where they lie in a crypt dating from the 6th century. His tomb has been a place of pilgrimage for many centuries. Famous visitors include Charlemagne, Charles V (Holy Roman Emperor), Philip II of Spain and Pope John Paul II. In Maastricht, the Eastern Orthodox Church belonging to the Russian Exarchate of the Ecumenical Patriarchate of Constantinople is also dedicated to Saint Servatius. The Sint Servaasbrug, the oldest bridge over the river Meuse in Maastricht, was named after Saint Servatius. The name 'Servaas' was a popular given name in Maastricht and surroundings for many centuries.

The Shrine of Saint Servatius is a 12th-century gilded reliquary chest in the Basilica of Saint Servatius, containing the saint's relics. It is a major work of Mosan art. During the Middle Ages it became known as the 'Chest of Distress' (Dutch: Noodkist) as it was carried around town in times of distress. A pilgrimage with the relics of Saint Servatius and other saints takes place every seven years: the Maastricht Pilgrimage of the Relics (Dutch: Heiligdomsvaart). The most venerated objects in the Treasury of the Basilica of Saint Servatius are the so-called Servatiana (objects that are associated with the saint), such as his pilgrim's staff, his crozier, his pectoral cross, his chalice, his paten and a symbolic key to heaven.

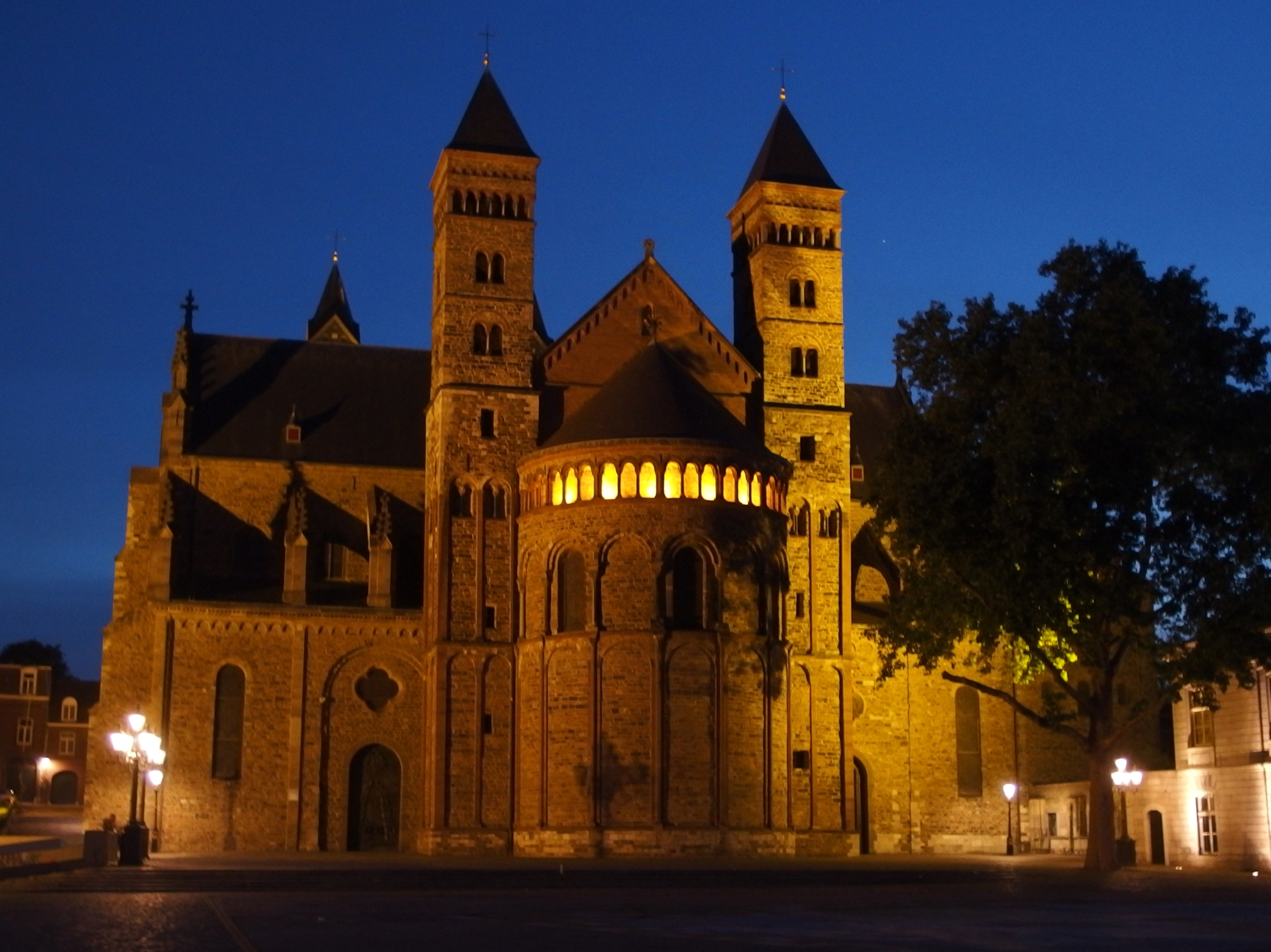
Basilica of Saint Servatius, Maastricht

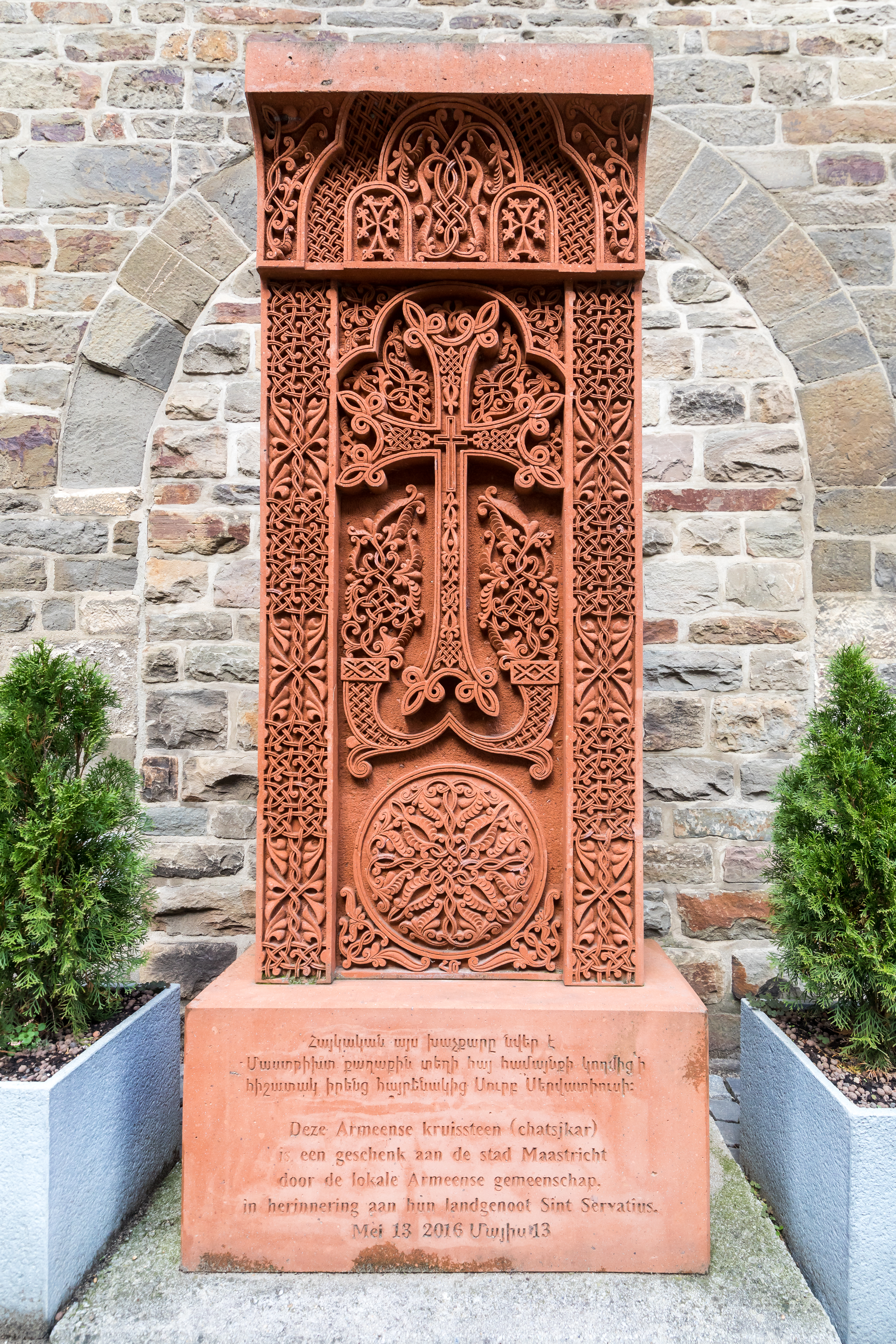
Khachkar at the Basilica of Saint Servatius

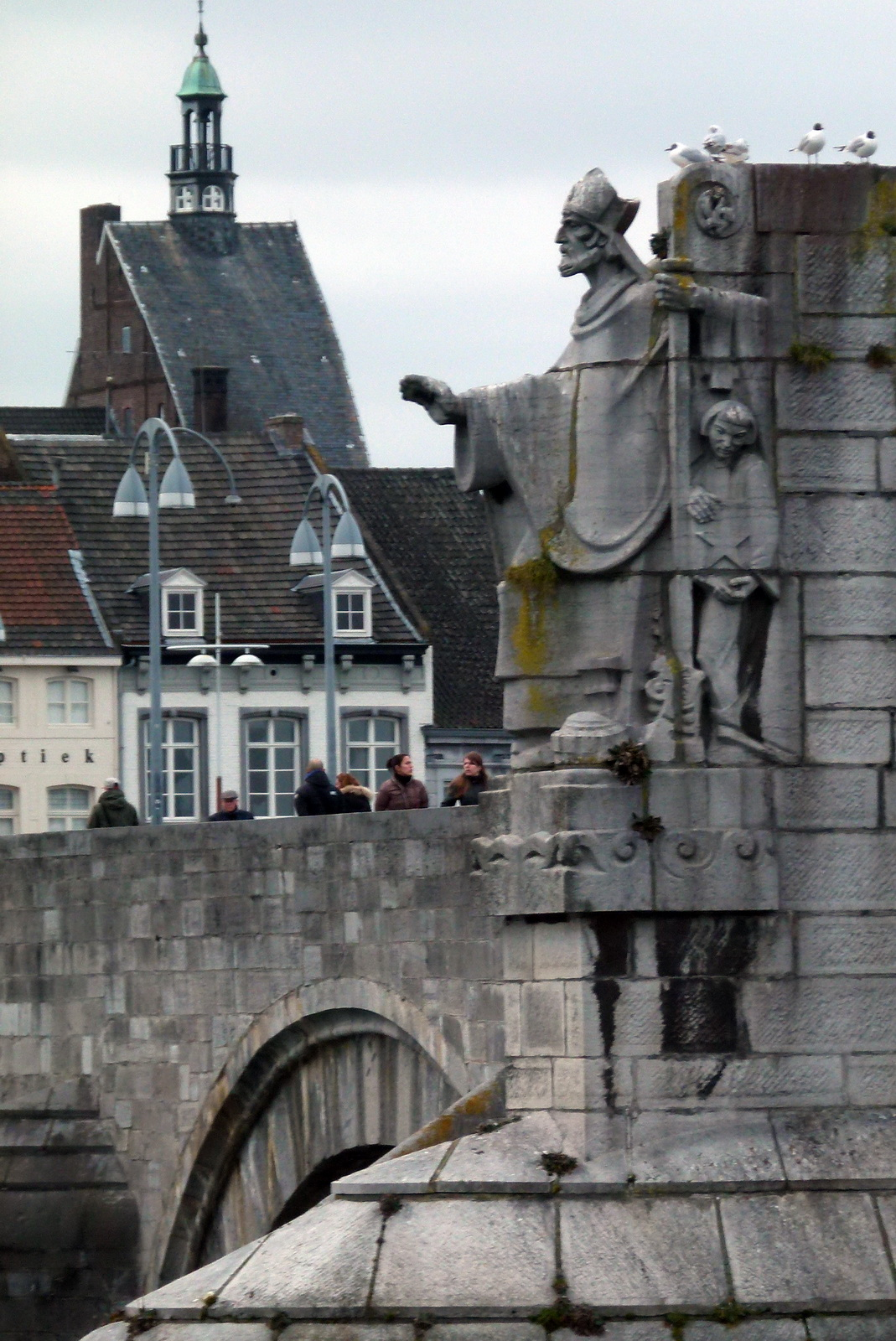
Statue of the saint on Sint Servaasbrug

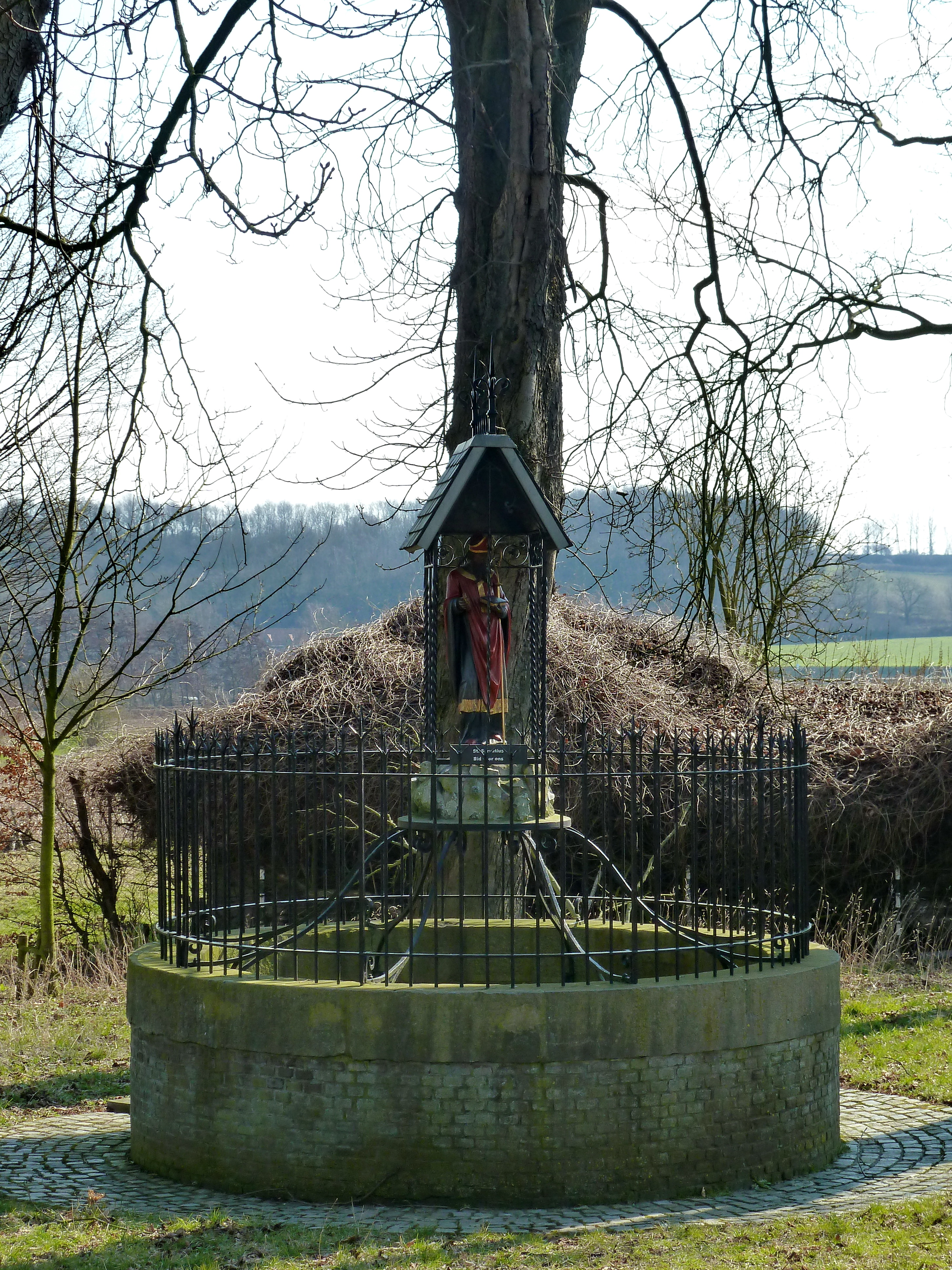
Saint Servatius Spring

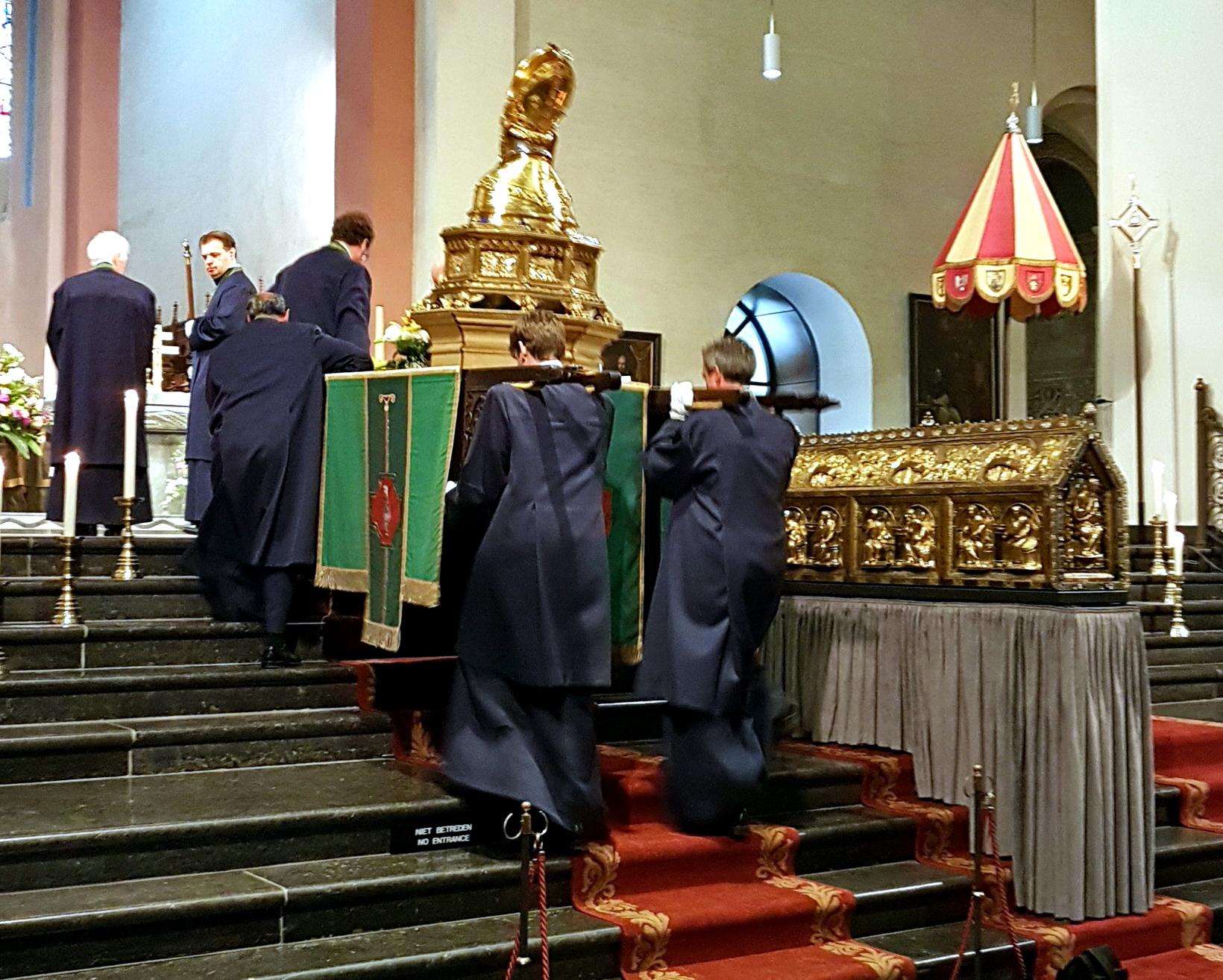
Relics display with Noodkist and reliquary bust

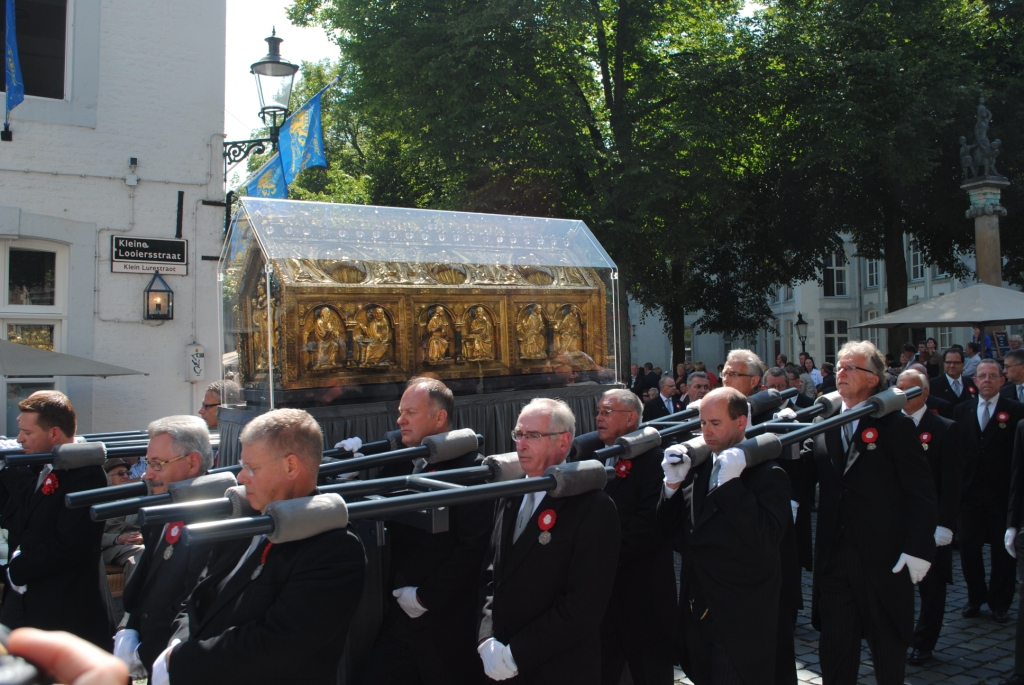
The Noodkist in procession

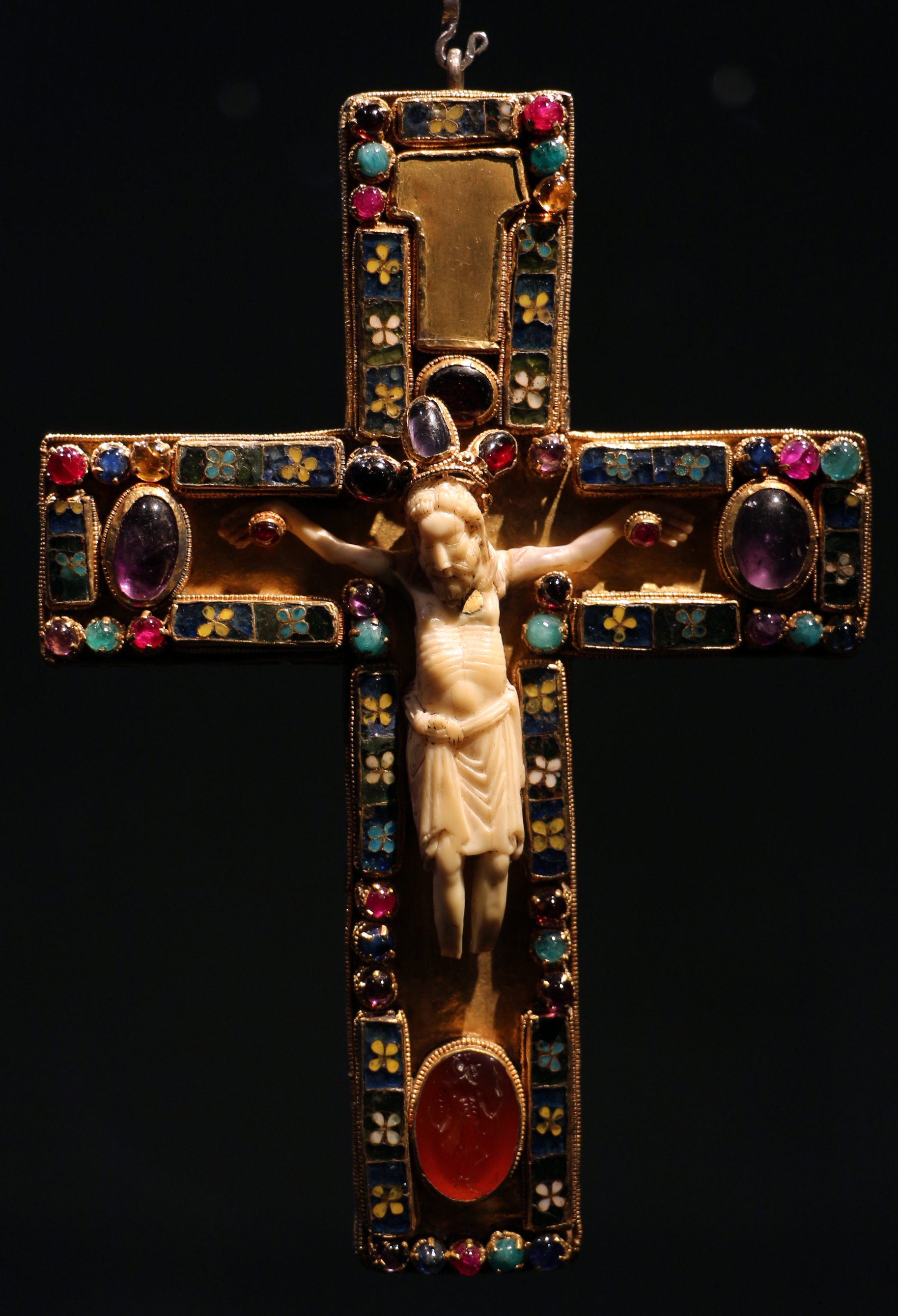
Pectoral cross of Saint Servatius

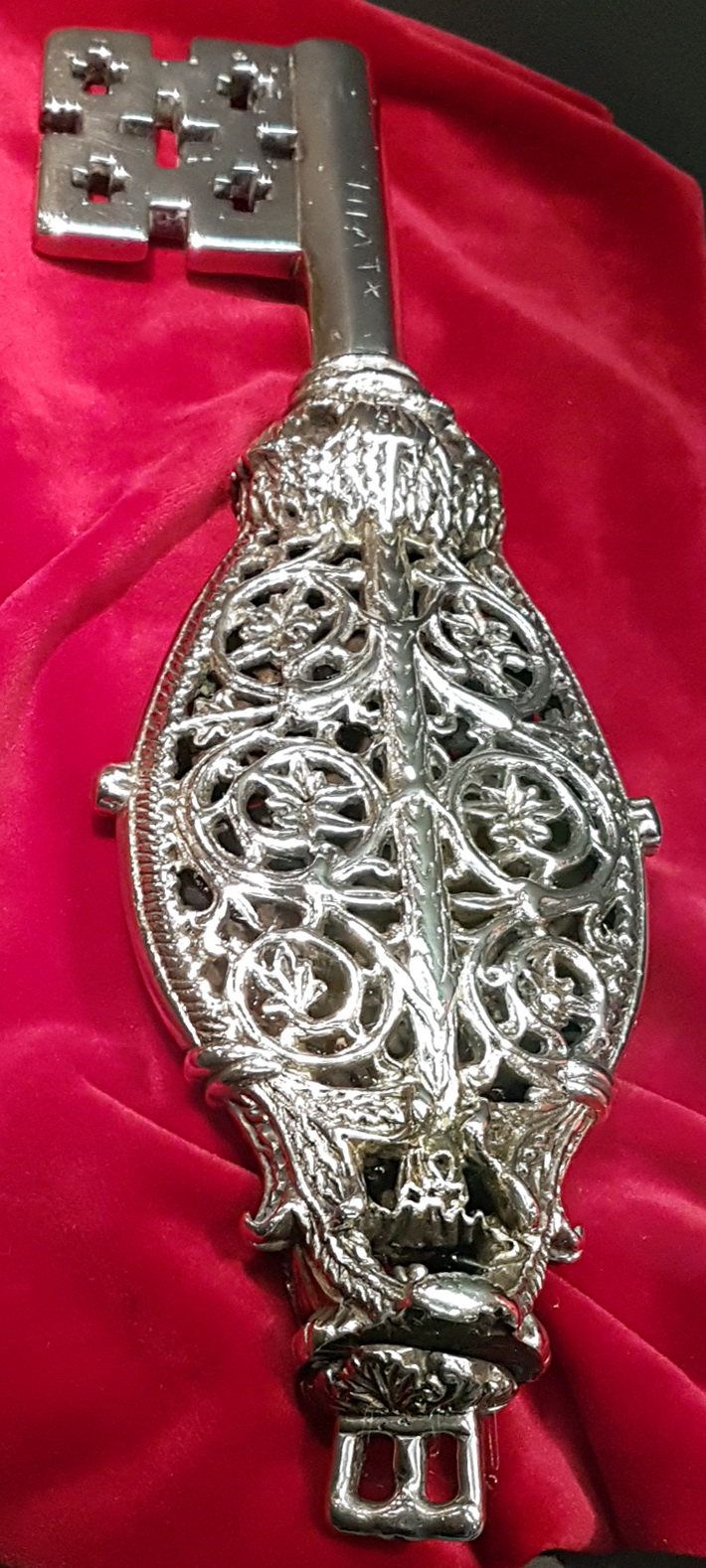
Key of Saint Servatius

=== Elsewhere ===
Other historic churches in the Netherlands, Belgium, France and Germany were dedicated to the saint, e.g. the collegiate churches of Grimbergen Abbey and Quedlinburg Abbey. In the Quedlinburg Treasury important relics of Saint Servatius are kept. In many churches around the world, reliquaries, statues, stained glass windows, altar pieces and paintings of Servatius are revered. St. Servatius Church in Kampung Sawah, Indonesia received the relics of Servatius from Maastricht in its establishment date on October 6, 1996. Since then, highly infused by Betawi culture, the festival honoring the relics has been celebrated annually by the parishioners of the church.

A mid-15th-century wooden sculpture of Memelia (the ancestor linking Servatius to Jesus) with the infant Servatius in her arms (identifiable by the infant wearing a bishop's mitre) in the Vendsyssel Historiske Museum in Hjørring, Denmark, is iconographically so similar to sculptures of the Madonna and Child, that it was long misattributed.

In Sri Lanka, St. Servatius' College was built around 1897 by a Belgian priest, Father Augustus Standard, on the bank of the river Nilwala at Pallimulla, Matara.

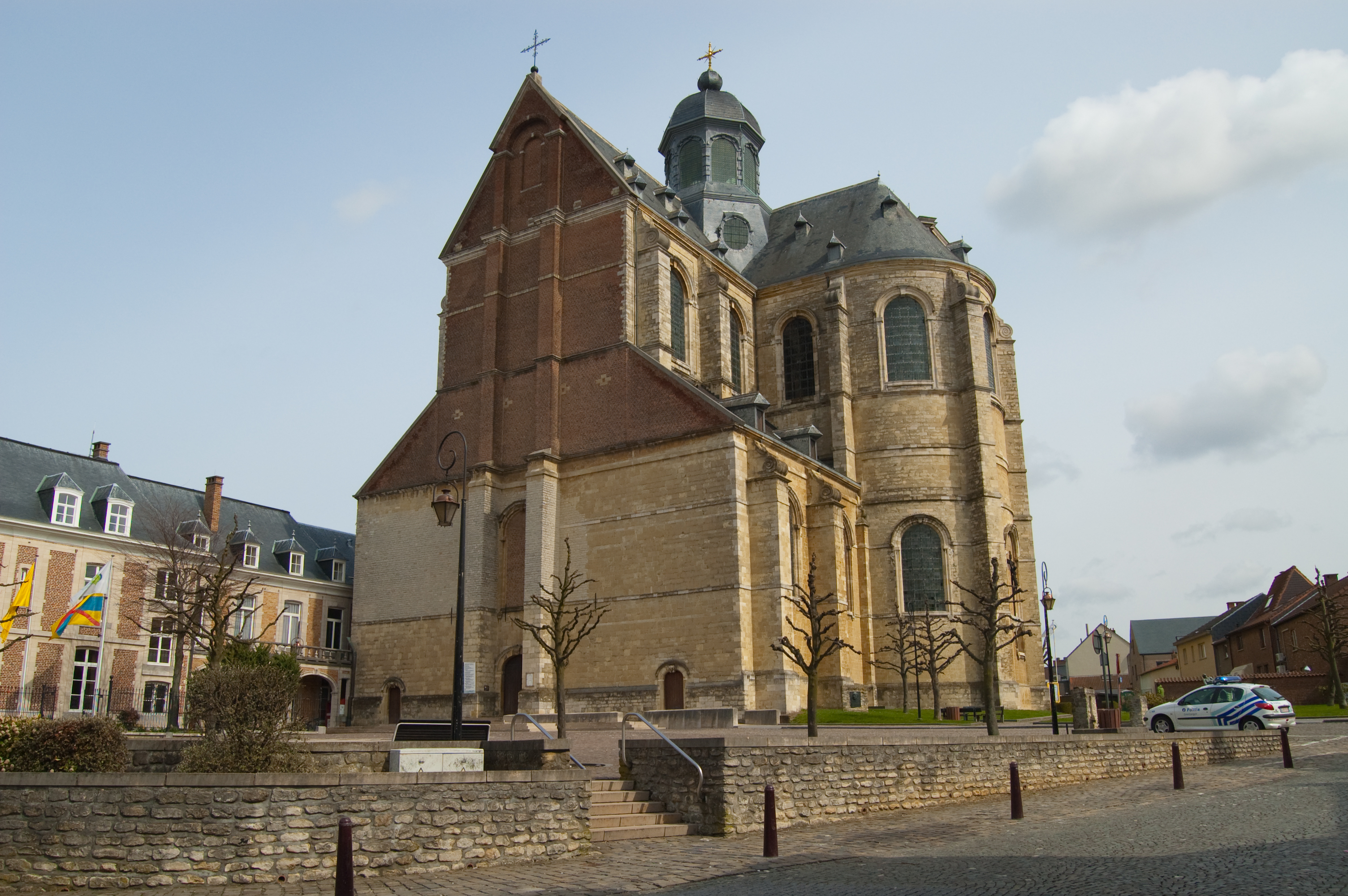
Saint Servatius Church, Grimbergen

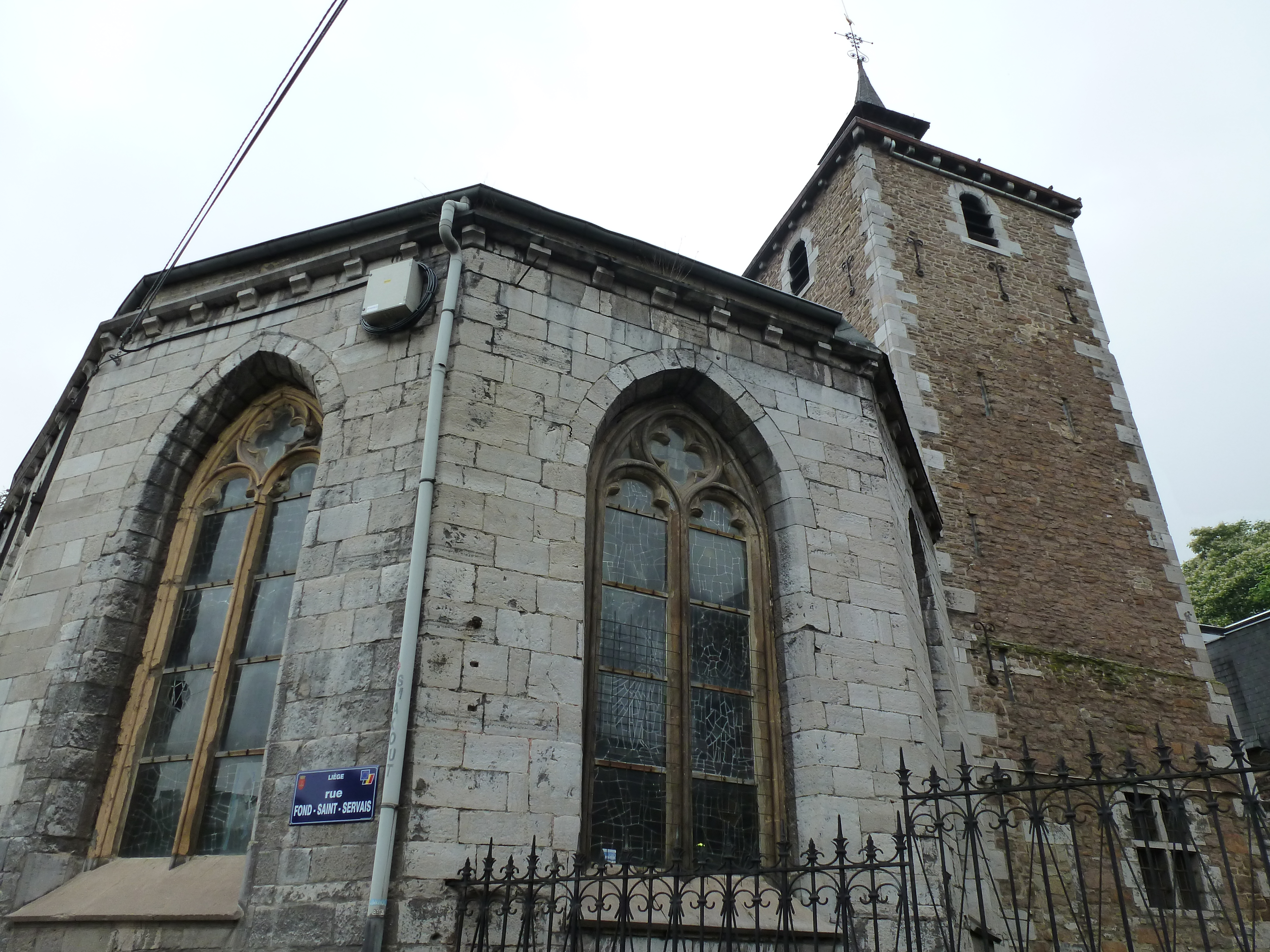
Saint Servatius Church, Liège

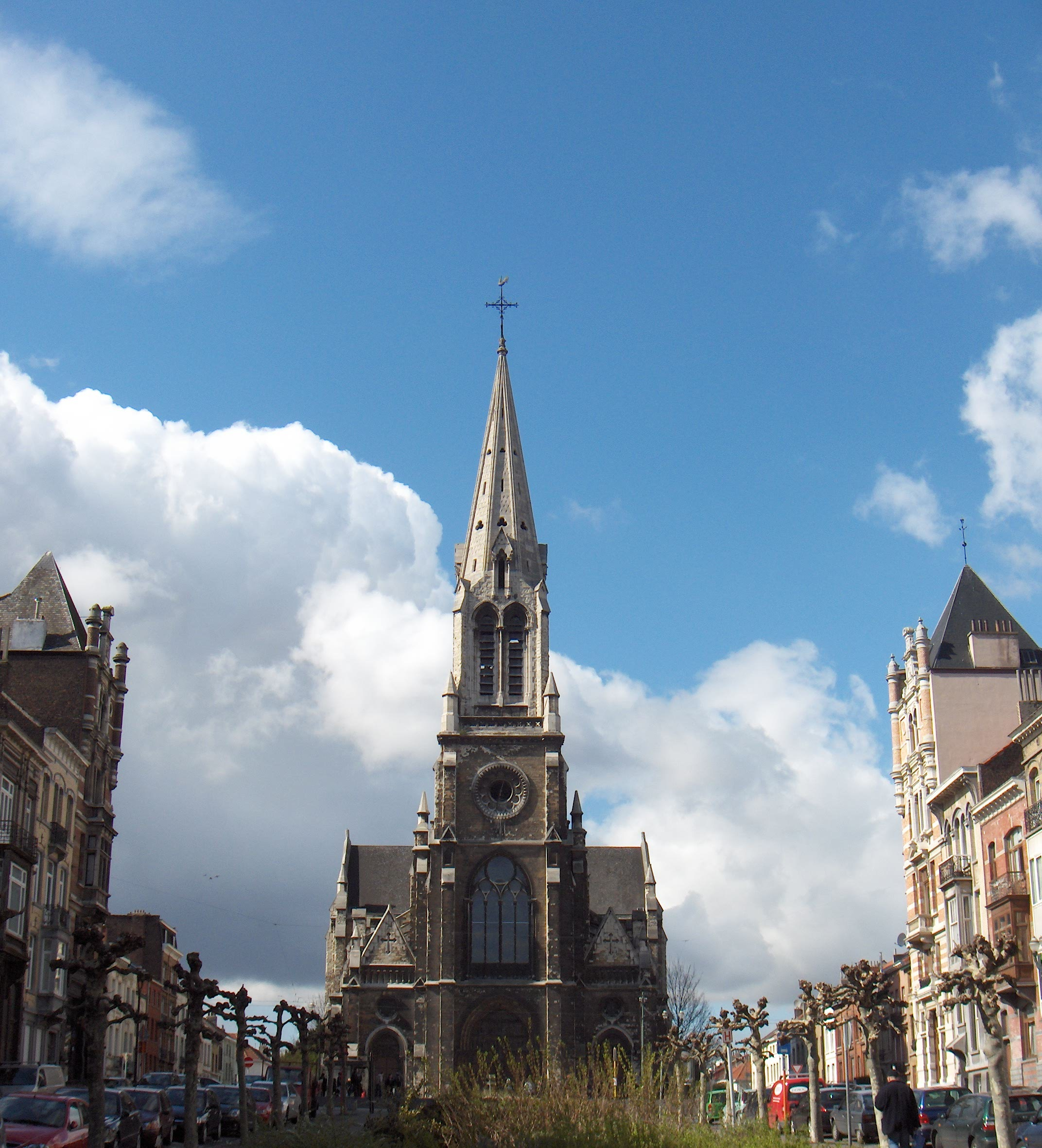
Saint Servatius Church, Brussels-Schaerbeek

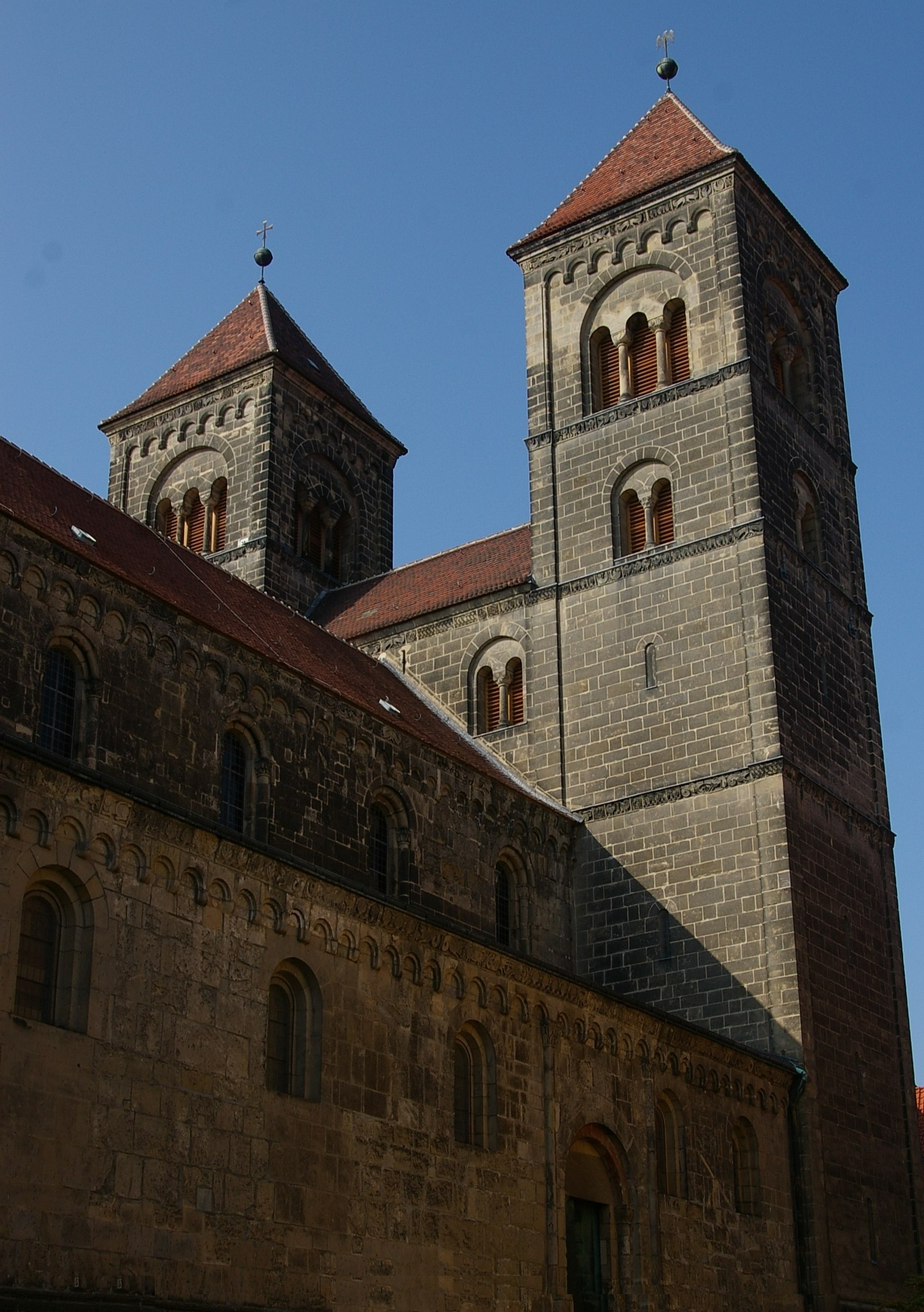
Saint Servatius Church, Quedlinburg

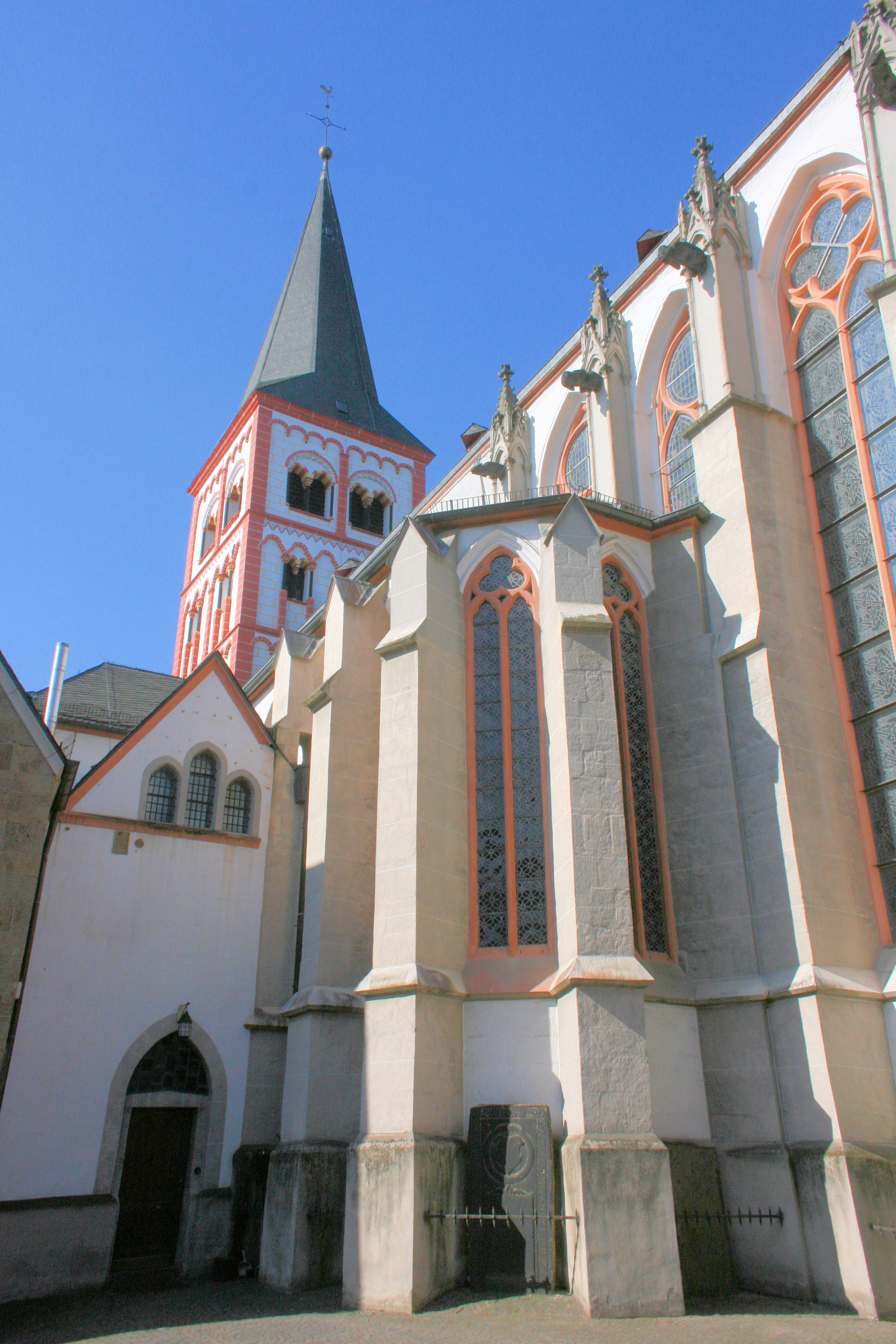
Saint Servatius Church, Siegburg

== See also ==
- Calendar of saints
- Servetus, Spanish theologian and martyr

== References and sources ==
- P. C. Boeren, Jocundus, biographe de saint Servais. Nijhoff, The Hague, 1972
- L. Jongen Heinrich (ed.), and Kim Vivian, Richard H. Lawson and Ludo Jongen (transl.)The Life of Saint Servatius: A Dual-language Edition of the Middle Dutch 'legend of Saint Servatius' by Heinrich Von Veldeke and the Anonymous Upper German 'life of Saint Servatius'. Mellen Press, 2005, ISBN 0-7734-6063-2
