= Ardennes Cross =

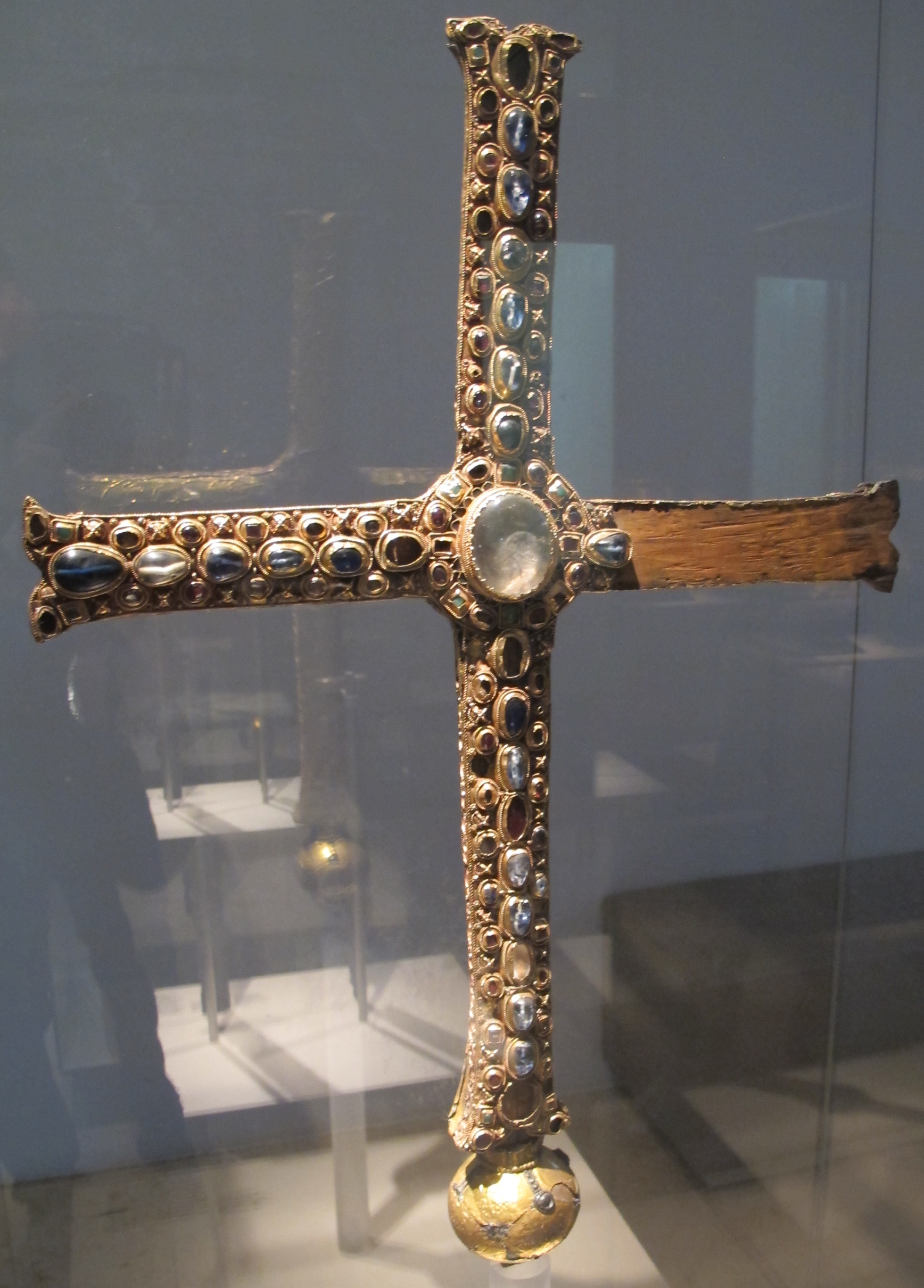
Front of the cross

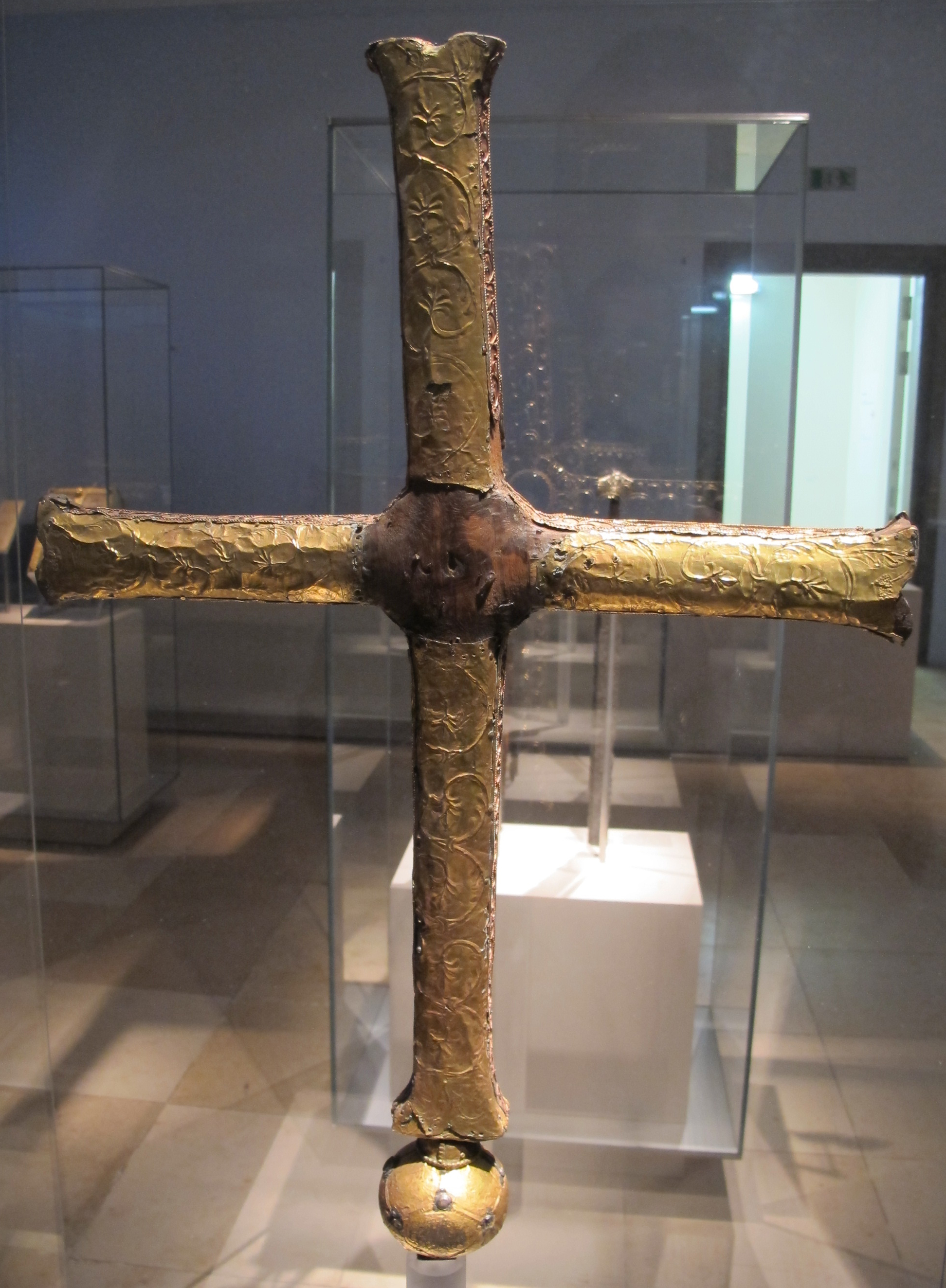
Back

The Ardennes Cross is a wooden processional cross from the Carolingian period, said to originate in a monastery in the Luxembourg Ardennes. Since 1894 it has been in the Germanisches Nationalmuseum, in Nuremberg (inventory number 763 kg).

Probably made between 825 and 850 in northern France by an unknown craftsman, it is 73 cm high, studded with gold and set with gems and coloured glass. It is one of the few surviving examples of a crux gemmata from the Carolingian period. These crosses were used in Christian liturgy between the 5th and 12th centuries, placed on the altar but without a figure of Christ. Their symbolic meaning and the impression given from a distance was more important than the cross' value and so (as here) coloured glass was also used alongside gemstones.

== Bibliography ==
- Ernst Günther Grimme: Goldschmiedekunst im Mittelalter. Form und Bedeutung des Reliquiars von 800 bis 1500. M. DuMont Schauberg, Köln 1972, ISBN 978-3-7701-0669-1, S. 21.
- Rainer Kahsnitz: Die Kunst der mittelalterlichen Kirchenschätze und das bürgerliche Kunsthandwerk des späten Mittelalters. In: Bernward Deneke und Rainer Kahsnitz (ed.): Das Germanische Nationalmuseum. Nürnberg 1852–1977. Beiträge zu seiner Geschichte. München & Berlin 1978, S. 690–760
- Rainer Kahsnitz: Das Ardennenkreuz. Eine crux gemmata aus karolingischer Zeit. In: Rudolf Pörtner (ed.): Das Schatzhaus der deutschen Geschichte. Das Germanische Nationalmuseum Nürnberg. München 1982, S. 151–175.
