= Doppelkirche Schwarzrheindorf =

Romanesque church in Bonn, Germany

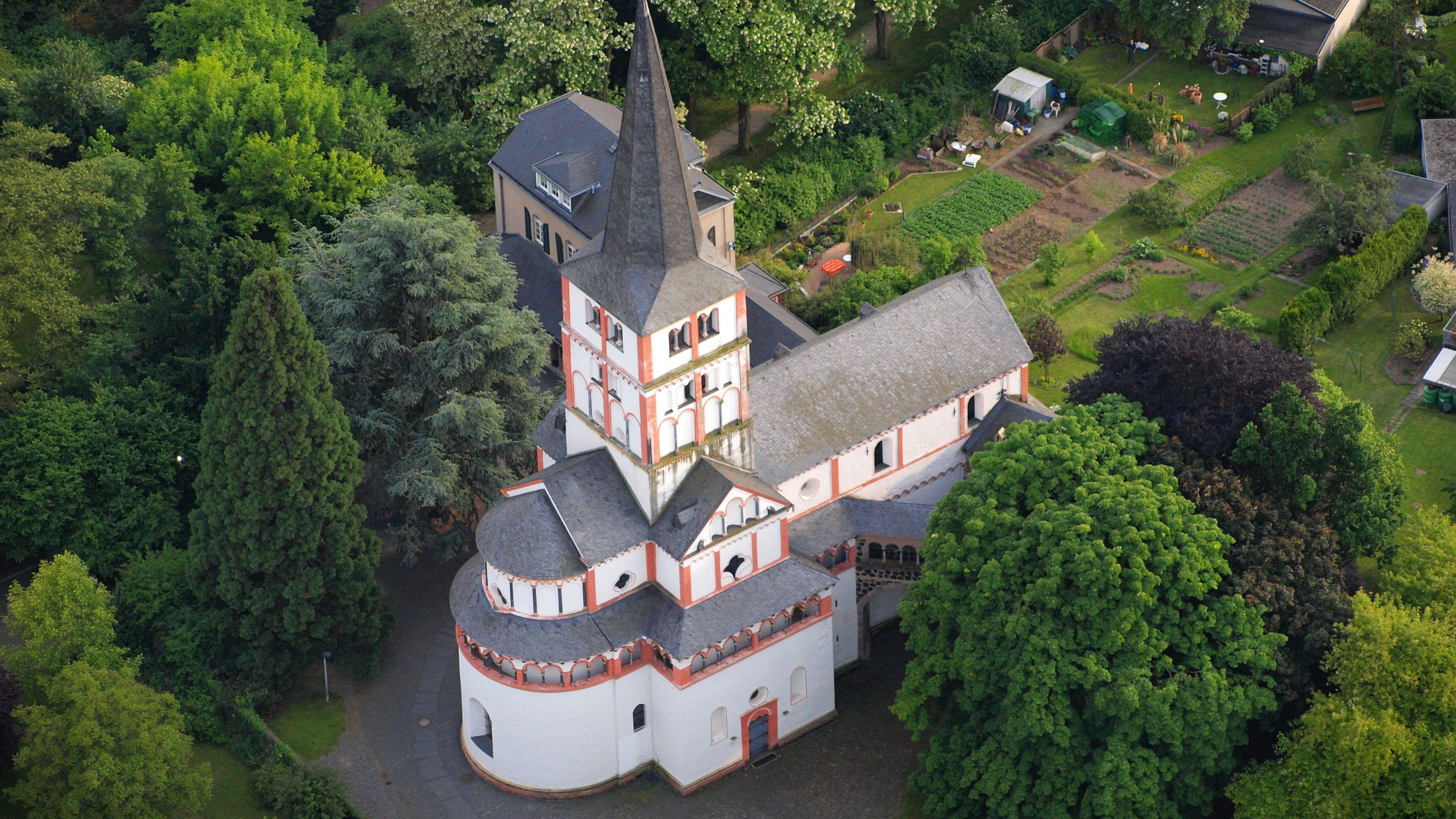

Religion
- Affiliation: Roman Catholic
- Year consecrated: 1151

Location
- Location: Bonn, Germany
- Interactive map of Doppelkirche Schwarzrheindorf
- Coordinates: 50°45′02″N 7°06′54″E

Architecture
- Type: church
- Style: Romanesque

The Doppelkirche Schwarzrheindorf (German: Doppelkirche St. Maria und Clemens) is a Romanesque church in Bonn, North Rhine-Westphalia, Germany. The church was once part of a Benedictine nunnery located at Schwarzrheindorf, now part of Bonn. The "double church" has an upper church dedicated to the Virgin Mary and a lower church dedicated to Pope Clement I. The church is famous for its fine 12th-century frescos.

== History ==
The church was probably built as a private chapel for Arnold of Wied, provost of Limburg Cathedral, Cologne Cathedral and the Basilica of Saint Servatius in Maastricht. Adjacent to the church, archaeological finds indicate that the chapel was once part of a castle belonging to the Wied family. In 1151 the Doppelkirche in Schwarzrheindorf was dedicated in the presence of King Conrad III of Germany. In the same year Arnold became archbishop of Cologne, a powerful position in that time.

After Arnold's death in 1156 his sister Hadwig of Wied turned the buildings into a monastery for Benedictine nuns. Hadwig was already abbess of Gerresheim and Essen Abbey and she now also became head of the Schwarzrheindorf congregation. Two of her sisters joined as well. Later, the monastery became a stift, a collegial body for female canons of noble origin. The upper gallery of the Doppelkirche was accessible only to the noble members of the religious community, where they were able to attend Holy Mass, separated from the commoners in the church below. In 1803 the stift was dissolved and the church was used for secular purposes until in 1868 it became a parish church.

== Art historical significance ==
The Doppelkirche Schwarzrheindorf is a well-preserved example of a double church from the High Middle Ages. The church has recently been plastered white but it is believed that this is what it looked like in the 12th century. It was originally conceived as a Zentralbau (central structure without a nave), following the example of the Palatine Chapel in Aachen. The church has a tall crossing tower and a dwarf gallery that not only encircles the entire apse but also both transepts. The dwarf gallery is accessible via an external staircase. The Romanesque capitals of the gallery are closely related to the carved capitals seen at the Basilica of Saint Servatius in Maastricht, where Arnold of Wied had initiated an extensive building campaign during his provostship.

The 12th-century frescos are largely original. In 1863 they were rediscovered underneath a layer of white plaster that had covered them for several decades. Both the painted upper chapel and the lower chapel are of great art historical significance. The subject matter for the frescos was derived from the teachings of contemporary theologians like Rupert of Deutz and Otto of Freising. In the upper chapel Arnold and Hadwig of Wied are painted below a Majestas Domini, stretching out on the floor as a token of humility.

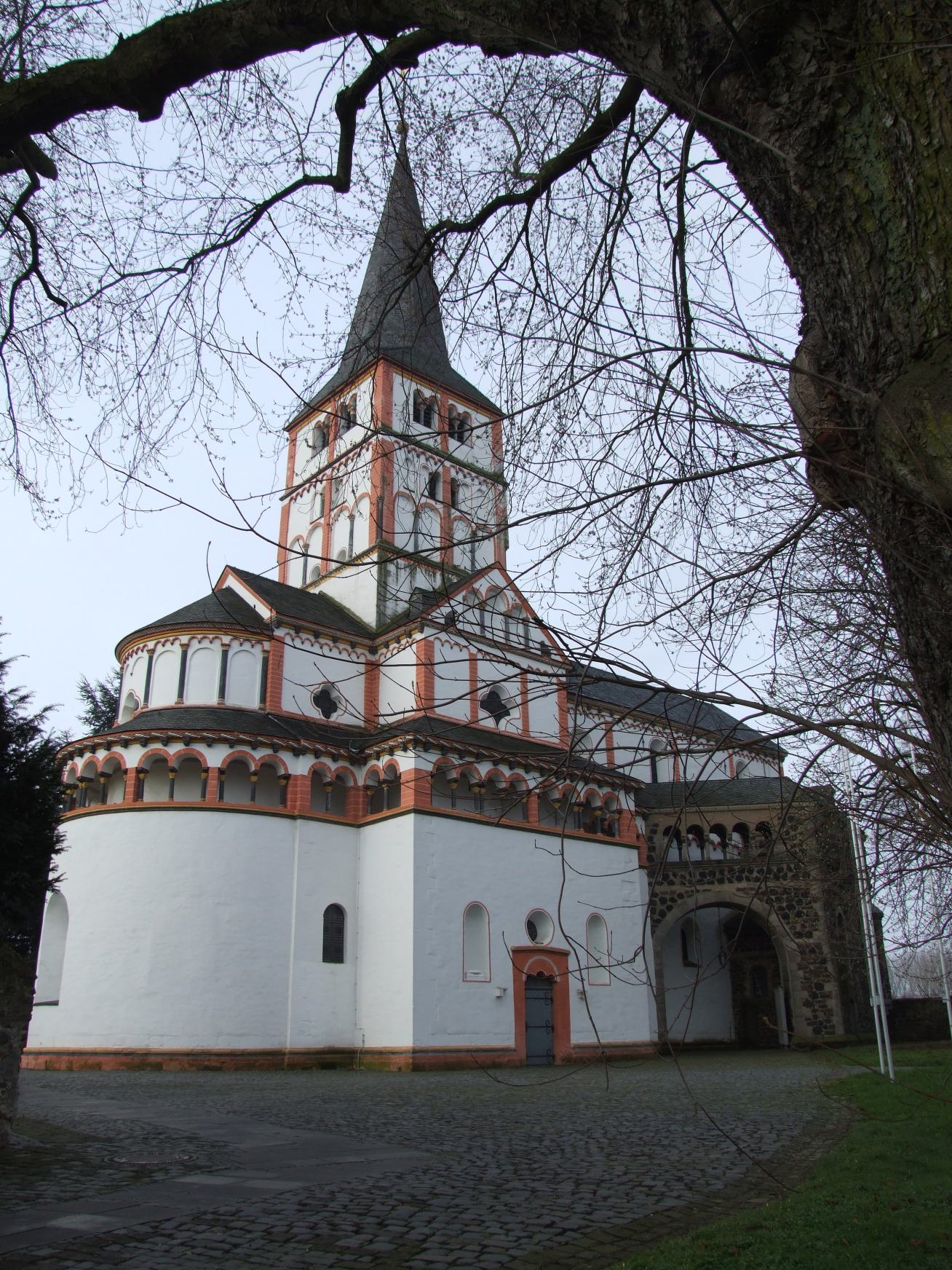
Doppelkirche

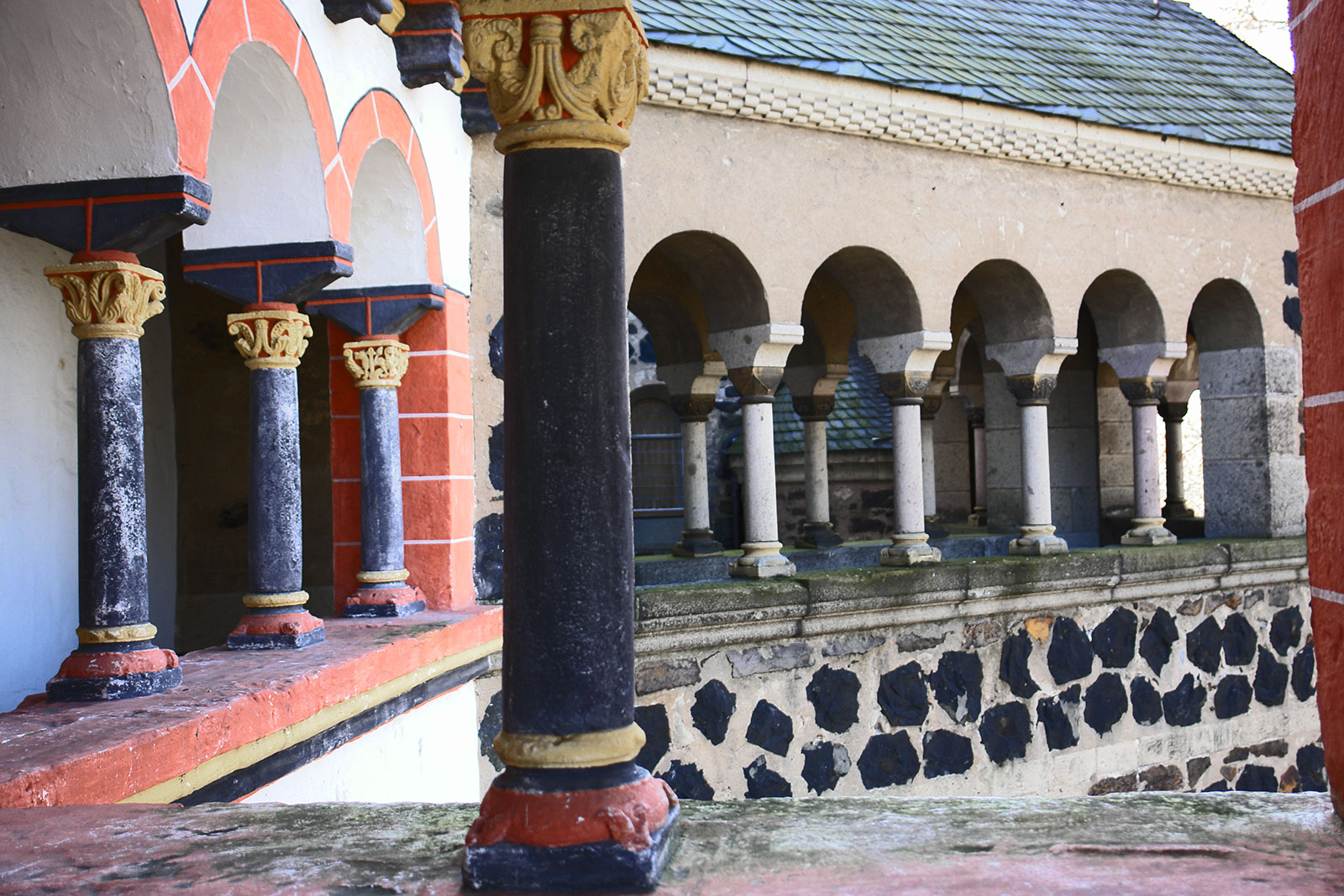
Dwarf gallery

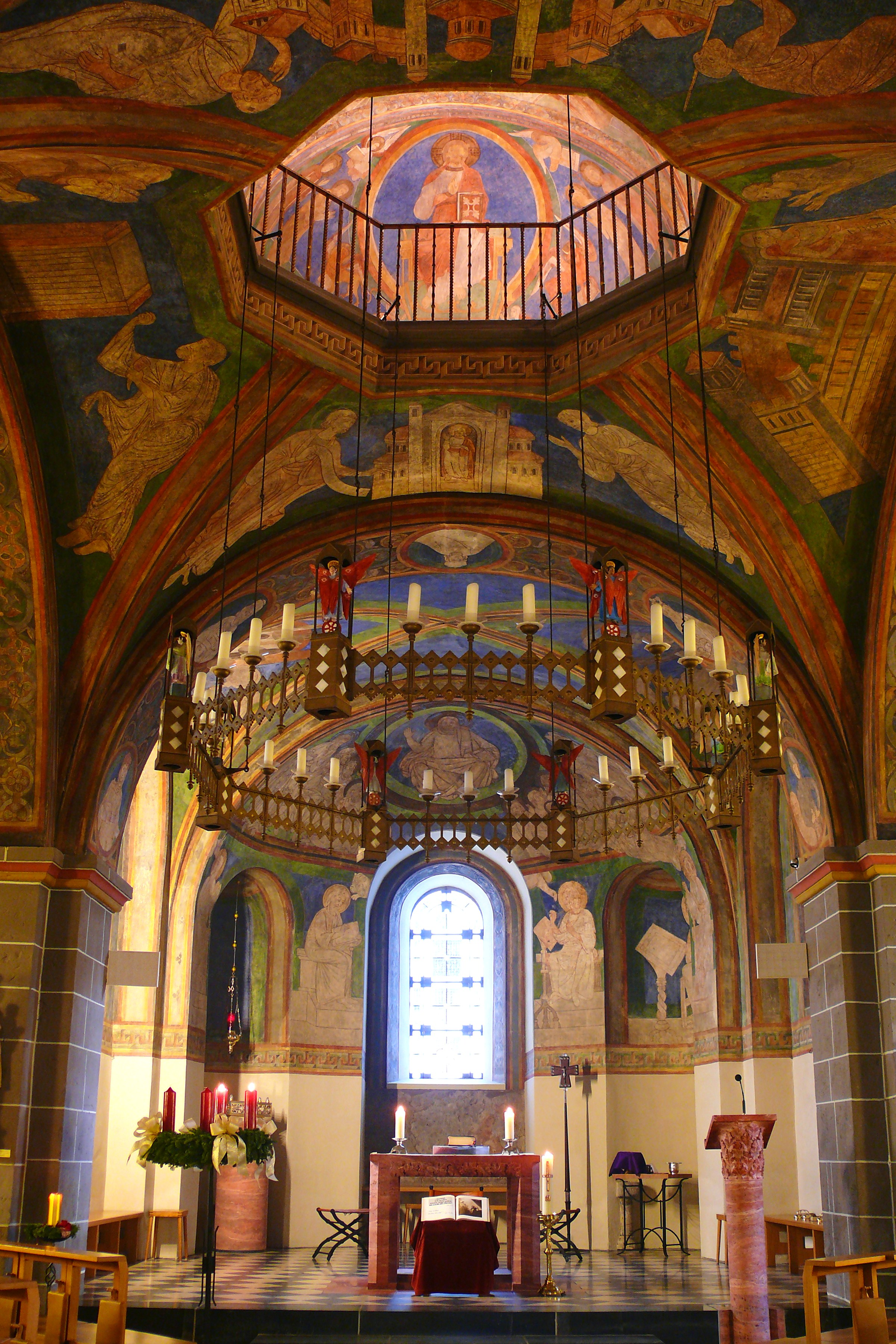
Interior lower church

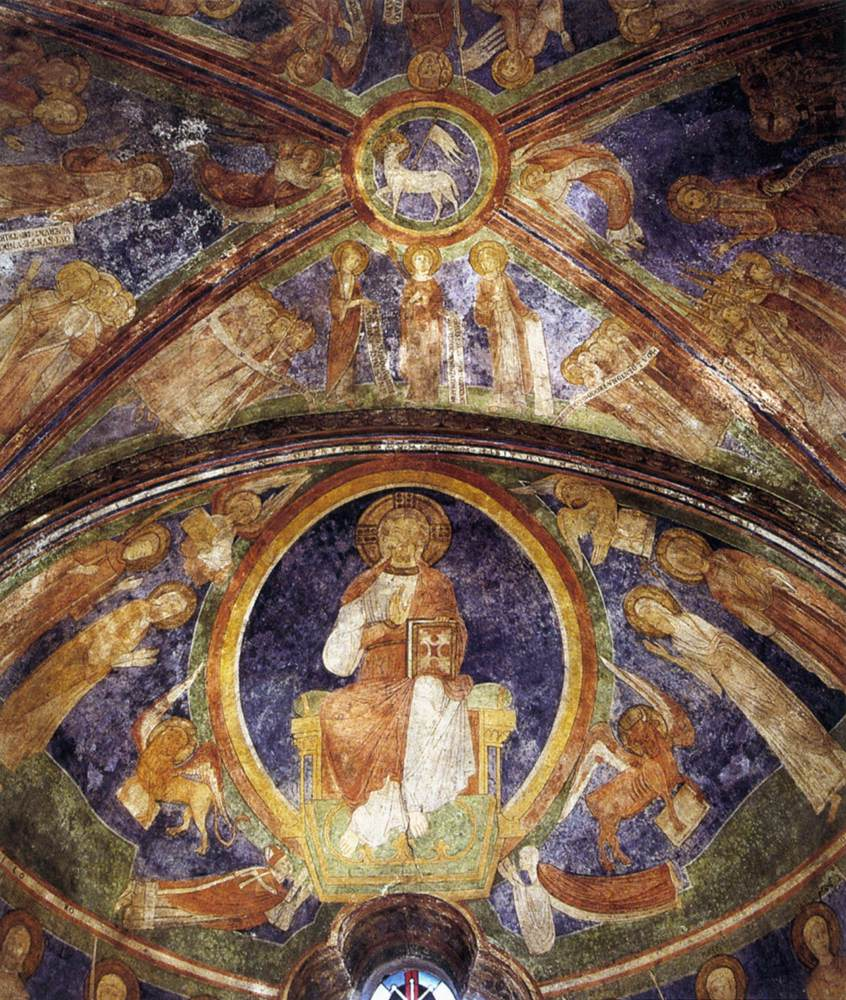
Painted upper chapel

== Bibliography ==
- Hartog, E. den, Romanesque Sculpture in Maastricht. Maastricht, 2002
- Kunisch, J., Konrad III., Arnold von Wied und der Kapellenbau von Schwarzrheindorf. Düsseldorf, 1966
- Kern, P., Das Bildprogramm der Doppelkirche von Schwarzrheindorf, die Lehre vom vierfachen Schriftsinn und die 'memoria' des Stifters Arnold von Wied. In: Deutsche Vierteljahrsschrift 77 (2003), 353-379
