= Basilica of Saint Servatius =

Roman Catholic church in Maastricht, Netherlands

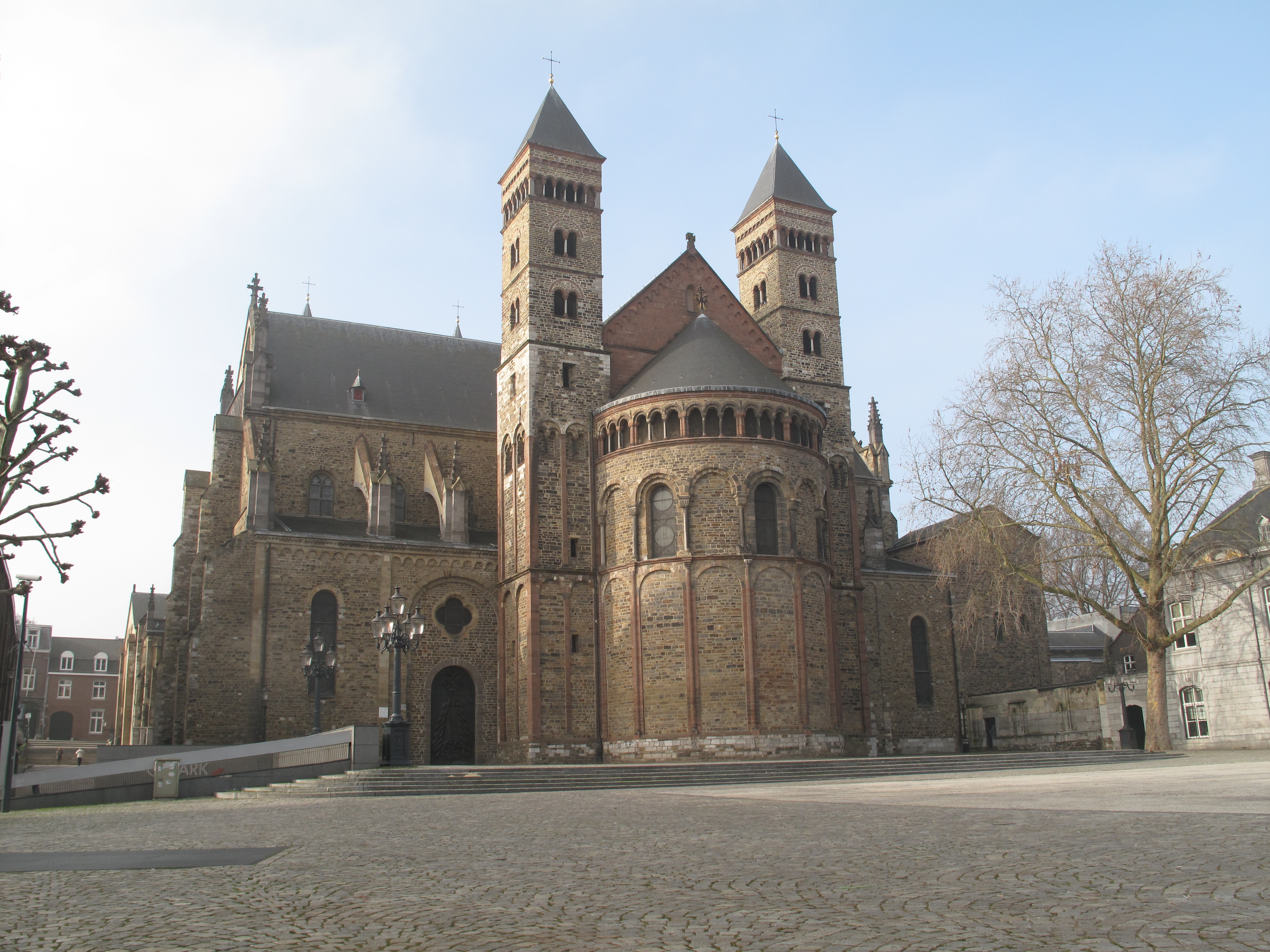
- St. Servatius at Vrijthof Square

Religion
- Affiliation: Roman Catholic
- Ecclesiastical or organisational status: Basilica minor

Location
- Location: Maastricht, Netherlands
- Interactive map of Basilica of Saint Servatius
- Coordinates: 50°50′55″N 5°41′14″E

Architecture
- Style: Romanesque

Website
- www.sintservaas.nl

The Basilica of Saint Servatius (Dutch: Sint-Servaasbasiliek) is a Roman Catholic church dedicated to Saint Servatius, in the center of Maastricht, Netherlands. The architecturally hybrid but mainly Romanesque church is situated next to the Gothic Church of Saint John, backing onto the town's main square, Vrijthof.

== History ==
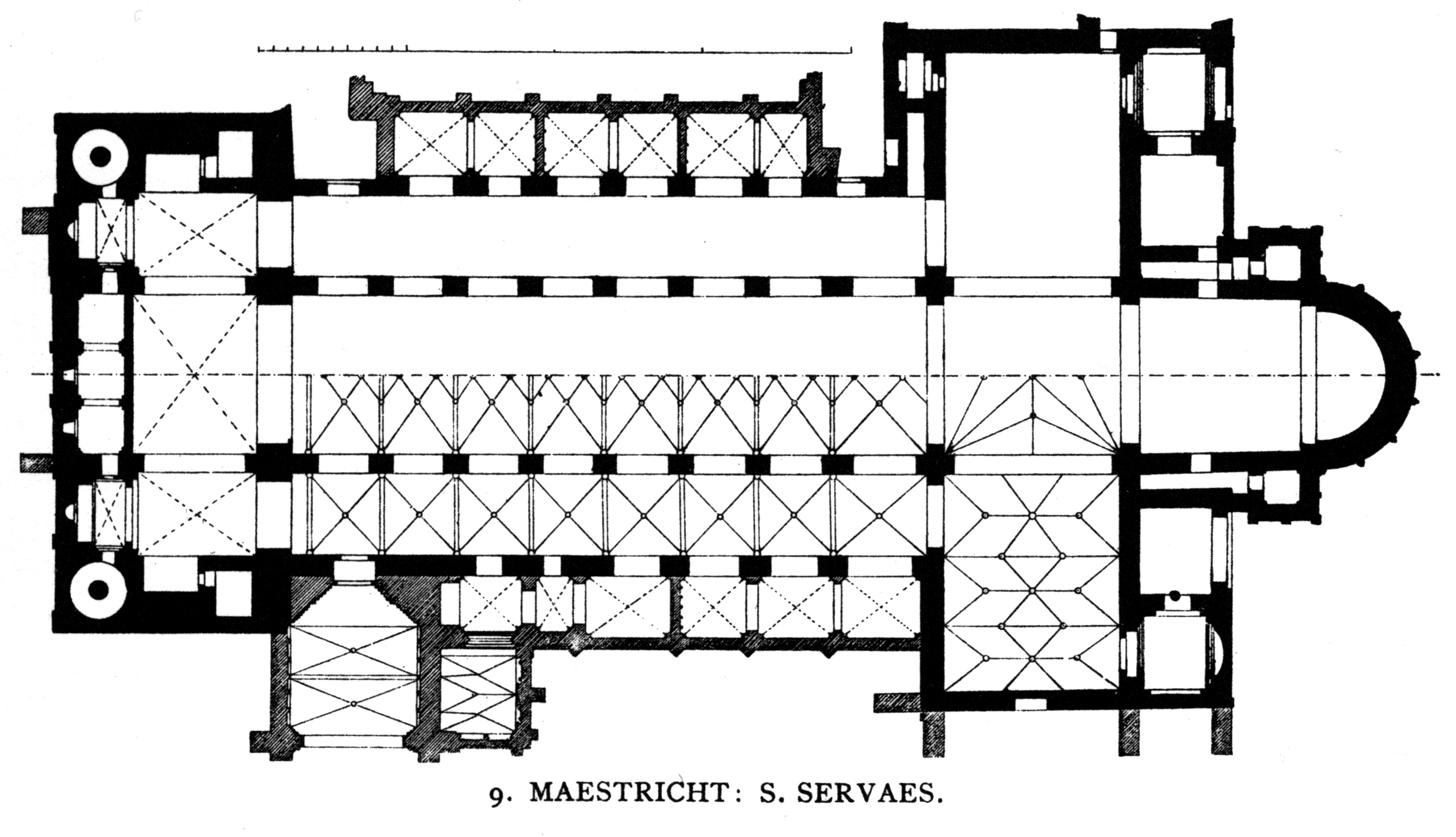
Church plan (without cloisters)

The present-day church is probably the fourth church that was built on the site of the grave of Saint Servatius, an Armenian missionary who was bishop of Tongeren and died allegedly in 384 in Maastricht. A small memorial chapel on the saint's grave was replaced by a large stone church built by bishop Monulph around 570. This church was replaced by a larger pilgrim church in the late 7th century, which was then replaced by the present-day structure, which was built in several stages over a period of more than 100 years. The nave was built in the first half of the 11th century, the transept in the second half of the century, and the choir and westwork in the 12th century. The Romanesque church was built during a period in which the chapter of Saint Servatius kept close ties to the Holy Roman Emperors, which resulted in a building that has the characteristics of a German imperial church. The dedication of the church in 1039 was attended by the emperor Henry III and twelve bishops. Most of the church's Medieval provosts were sons of the highest ranking German noble families. Several held the office of chancellor of the German Empire; at least eight provosts went on to become archbishops.

The sculpted Bergportaal, at the south side of the church, was begun around 1180 and can be considered late Romanesque or early Gothic. All the chapels along the side aisles are Gothic (14th and 15th centuries), and so is the vaulted ceiling of the nave and the transept. In 1556 a late Gothic spire was added onto the westwork between the two existing towers. In 1770 the entire westwork was crowned with Baroque helmet spires, designed by the Liège architect Etienne Fayen.

Over the centuries the interior of the church underwent many changes. In the 17th century, the Gothic choir rood screen with sculpted depictions of the life of Servatius was demolished. Fragments from the 14th-century screen were discovered during the 1980s restoration works and are now kept in the church's lapidarium in the East crypt. By the end of the 18th century, the entire church interior had been painted white, the colourful Medieval stained glass windows had been replaced by colourless glass, and the church looked distinctly Baroque.

The north transept holds some epitaphs, of which the one for Egidius Ruyschen in Renaissance style is probably the most original. Nearby is the impressive tomb of the Count and Countess van den Bergh (Johannes Bossier, 1685), which was transferred from the Dominican church of Maastricht. From the Dominican church were also transferred the ornate confessionals by Daniël van Vlierden (Hasselt, 1700), which are located in various parts of the church.

In 1797 the chapter was dissolved by the French revolutionaries and the church was used as a horse stable by the troops. The furnishings of the church were sold, stolen or trashed. Likewise, most of the church treasures disappeared during the first years of the French occupation. In 1804 the church was returned to the parish but the building was an empty ruin. It was during the period that followed that most of the damage was done. The 11th-century Chapel of Saint Maternus and the 15th-century Koningskapel (built by the French kings Charles VII and Louis XI) were considered irreparable and were demolished. For liturgical reasons, it was deemed necessary to lower the elevated choir, for which the underlying 11th-century crypt was demolished. In 1846 the four panels that belonged to the reliquary chest of Saint Servatius (Noodkist) were sold to an antiques dealer and ended up in the Royal Museums of Art and History in Brussels.

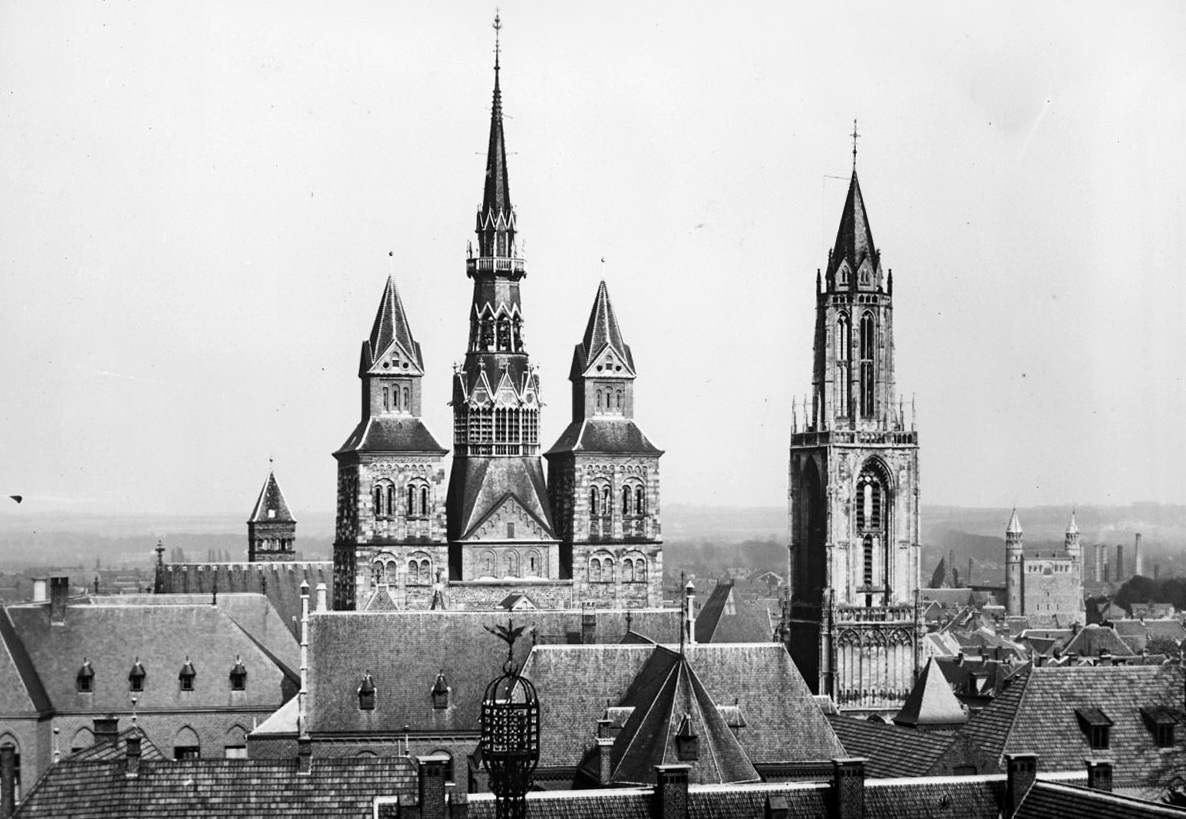
1937 with central tower

Between 1866 and 1900 the church underwent major restorations during which some of the damage done earlier in the century was reversed. The restoration was led by famous Dutch architect Pierre Cuypers. In 1955 a fire caused Cuypers' Gothic Revival westwork spire to fall through the roof of the church, which made another thorough restoration necessary (1982–1991). During this latter restoration, Cuypers' colourful interior decoration scheme was largely removed. During this most recent restoration, extensive excavations that were carried out in the church and adjacent buildings, revealed a wealth of information about the history of the church and its predecessors.

== Religious significance ==
Through the ages, the presence of the grave of Saint Servatius in the church crypt and the many relics in the church treasury, have drawn large numbers of pilgrims. Starting in the 14th century (but perhaps earlier) a seven-yearly pilgrimage was organized in cooperation with nearby Aachen Cathedral and Kornelimünster Abbey, attracting tens of thousands of visitors to the region. This Pilgrimage of the Relics (Dutch: Heiligdomsvaart) continued until 1632 when Maastricht became affiliated with the Dutch Republic (Capture of Maastricht). The Pilgrimage of the Relics was revived in the 19th century and the tradition continues today. The most recent Pilgrimage of the Relics took place from May 24 to June 3, 2018.

Today, the Basilica of Saint Servatius is the main church of the Deanery of Maastricht, which belongs to the Diocese of Roermond. The church continues to be a center of Catholicism in Maastricht (the other main church being the Basilica of Our Lady). The church was made a Basilica Minor by Pope John Paul II during his visit in 1985.

== Art historical significance ==
Although the present building conveys a rather hybrid image of architectural styles, the church of Saint Servatius is considered to be one of the most important religious buildings in the former Prince-Bishopric of Liège. Both the East choir and the Westwork of the Maastricht church have been influential in the development of Romanesque architecture in the Meuse and Rhine valleys. Several authors have pointed out the significance of the South portal's late Romanesque sculpture for the early development of Gothic sculpture in France.

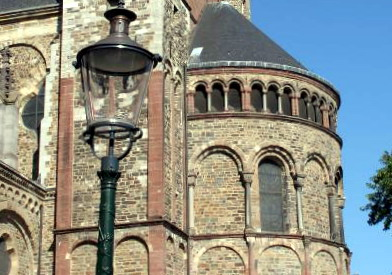
Southeastern choir tower, apse and dwarf gallery

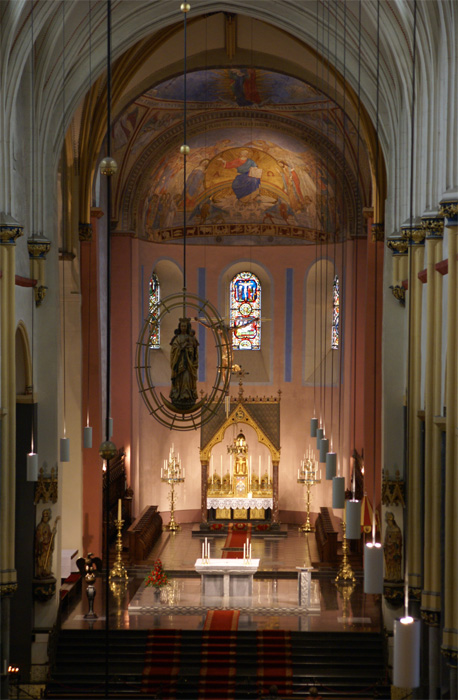
Interior East choir

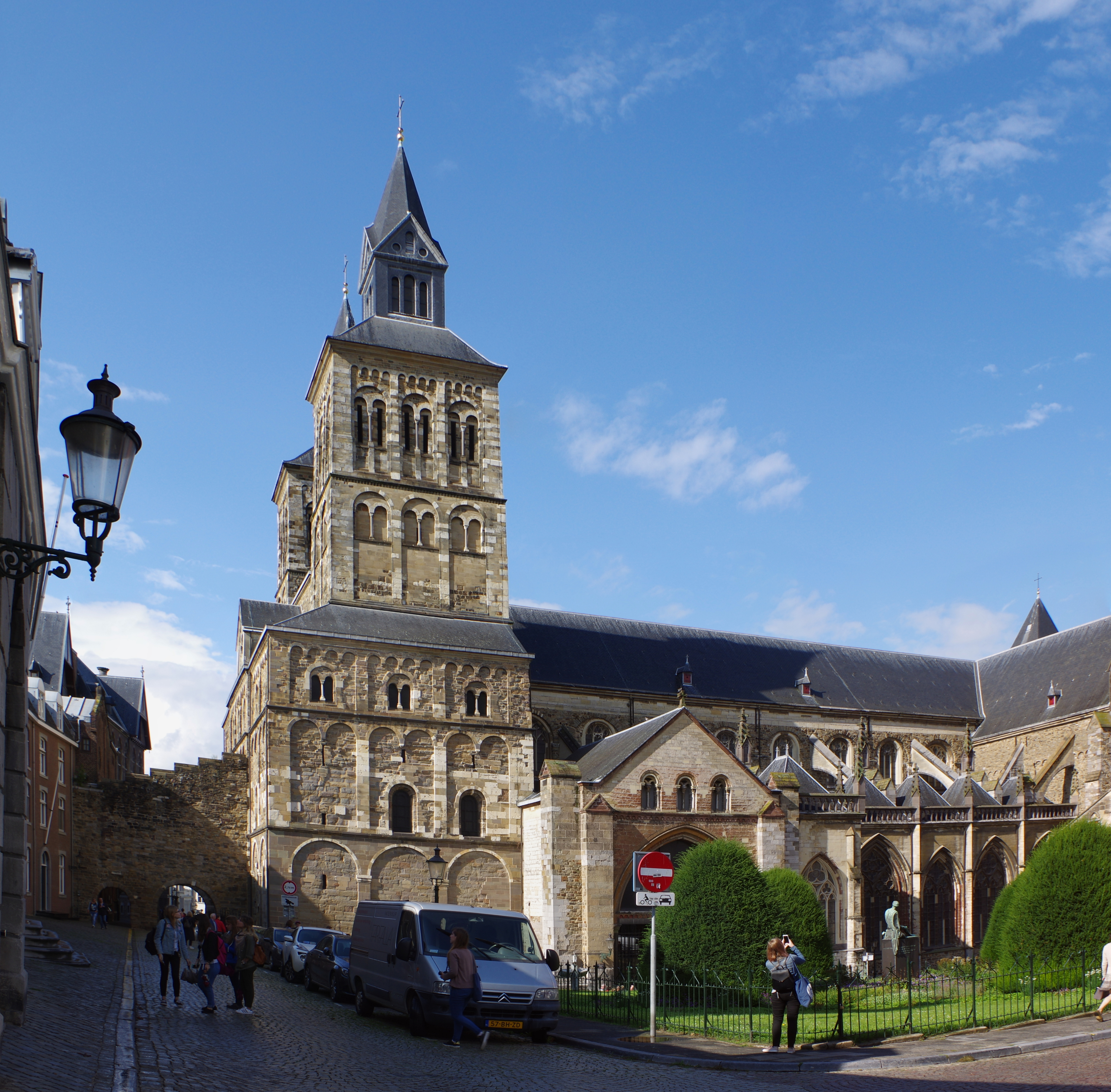
Westwork and South portal

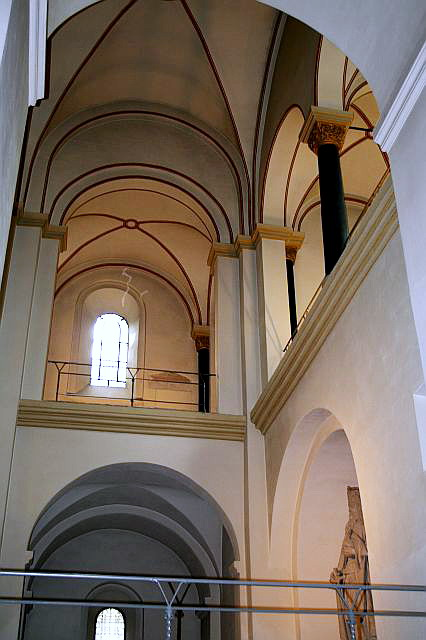
Interior Westwork, North gallery

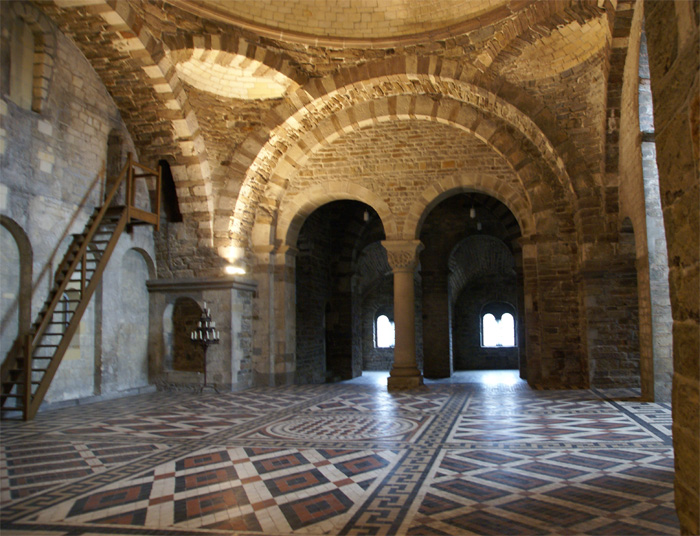
'Emperor's Hall', Westwork

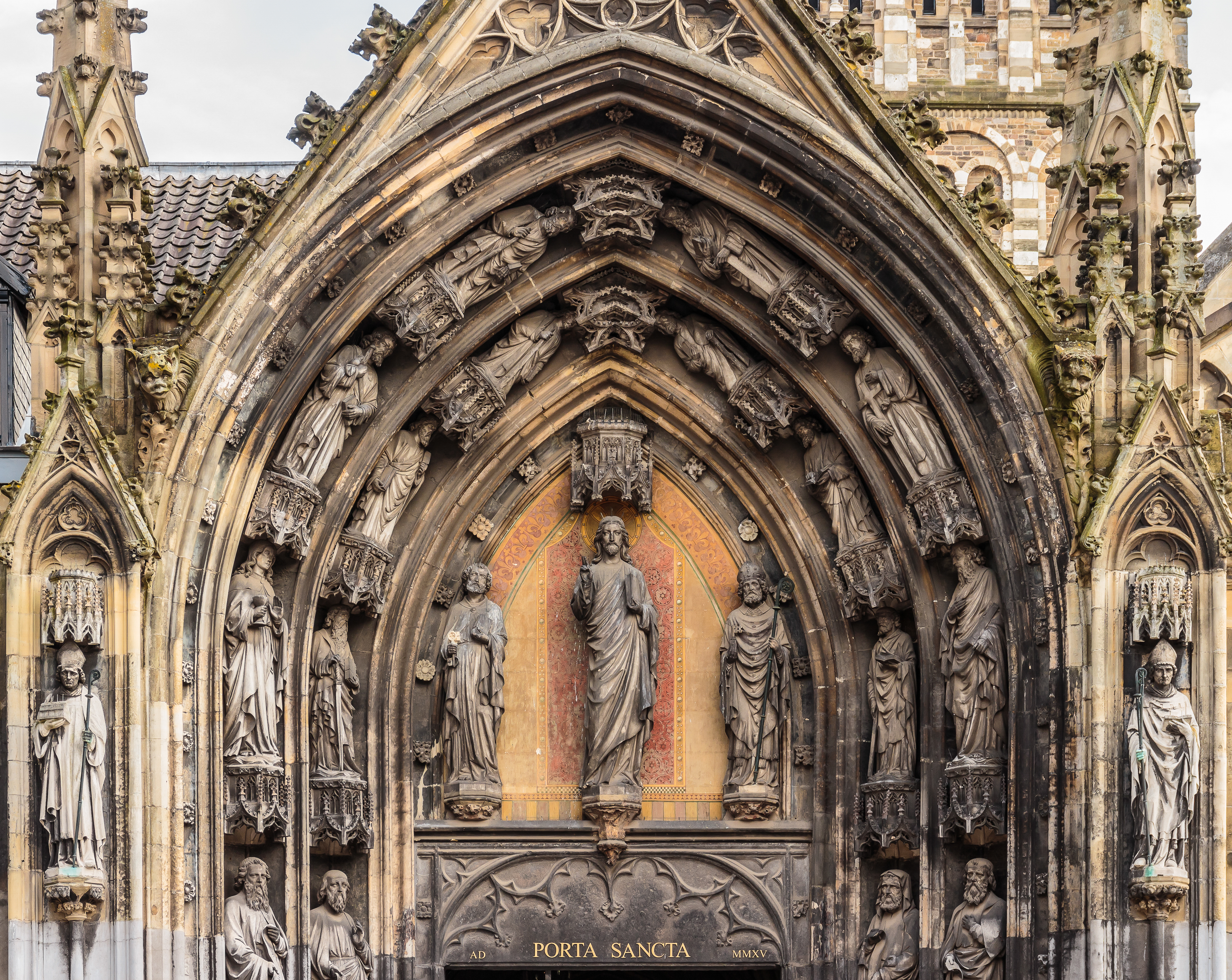
Detail of the north portal

=== Romanesque sculpture ===
Both the exterior of the East choir and the interior of the westwork of Saint Servatius contain architectural sculpture that is considered amongst the most interesting in the Mosan region. The 34 elaborately carved capitals in the Westwork depict scenes from books well-known to the canons, such as Saint Augustine's De Civitate Dei and various bestiaries. Recurrent themes are: botanical ornaments, animals, humans fighting with animals, humans entangled in plants, and humans engaged in daily activities. A close relationship has been established by art historians between the Maastricht Westwork capitals and those of the East choir of Our Lady's in Maastricht, the Rolduc crypt, the dwarf gallery of the Doppelkirche Schwarzrheindorf (Bonn), and the Wartburg palace (near Eisenach).

Also in the Westwork of Saint Servatius is a sculpted Romanesque choir screen, also referred to as the double relief. The lower rectangular part depicts the Virgin and Child in a mandorla held by two angels, the upper part shows Christ handing over the keys of Heaven to Saint Peter and Saint Servatius. The relief closely relates to a choir screen in Saint Peter's in Utrecht. Elsewhere in the church a 12th-century tympanum depicting the Majestas Domini can be found as part of a former portal. The choir ceiling shows remnants of ceiling paintings, depicting the visions of Zechariah. This may be the only surviving work by a once important group of Maastricht and Cologne based painters, who received high praise from Wolfram von Eschenbach in his Parzival.

The church's South portal (Bergportaal) contains sculpture that marks the period of transition between late Romanesque and early Gothic sculpture. The sculpted tympanum and the two inner archivolts date from around 1180 and are Romanesque is style, the rest of the portal can be considered Gothic and dates from around 1215.

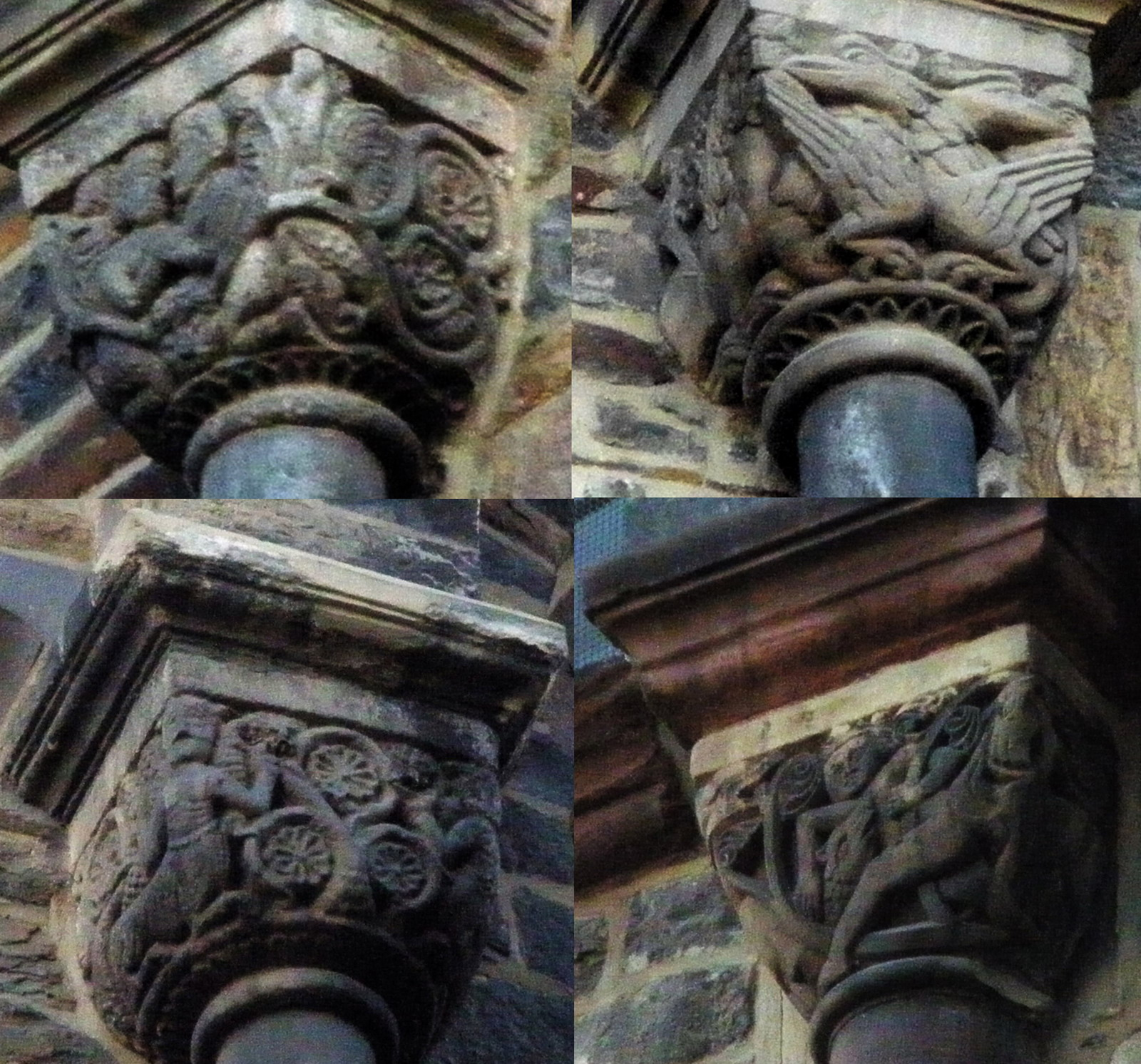
East façade capitals

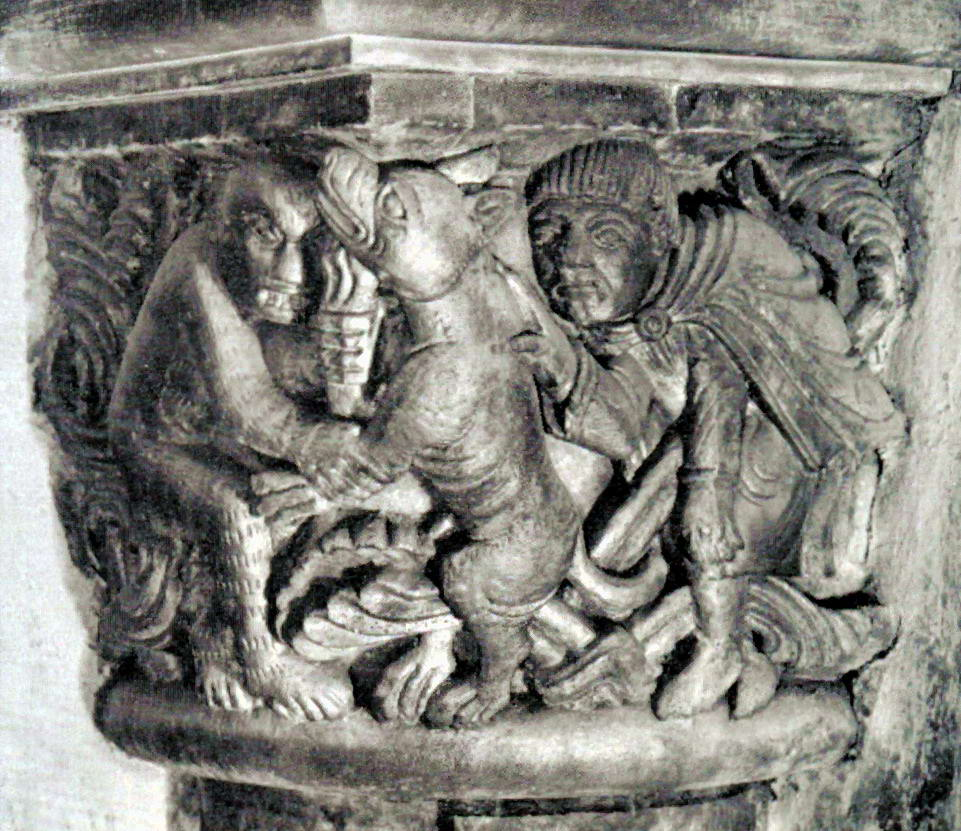
Carved capital in Westwork

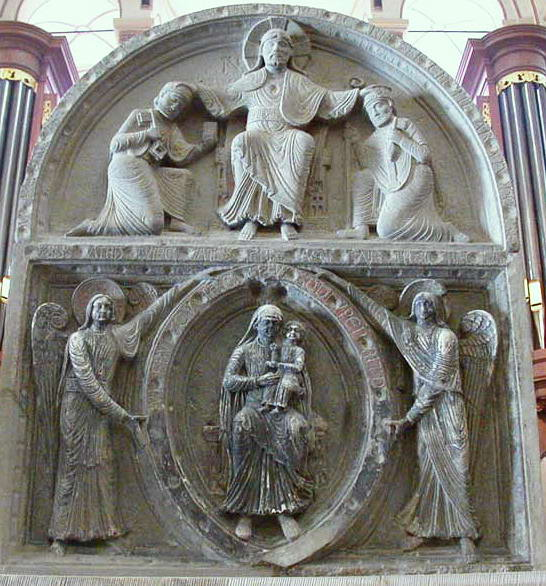
Choir screen Westwork

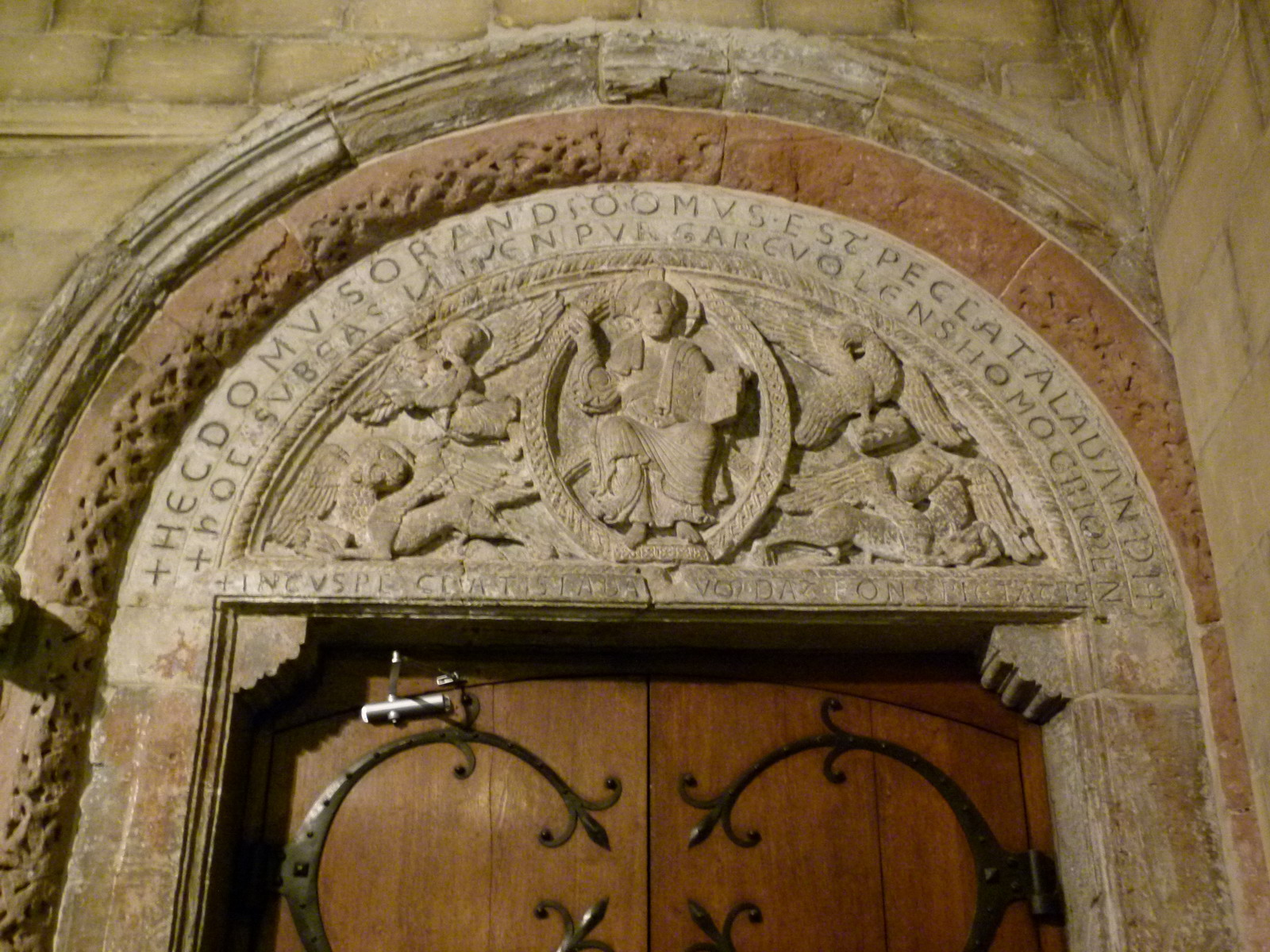
Northwest portal

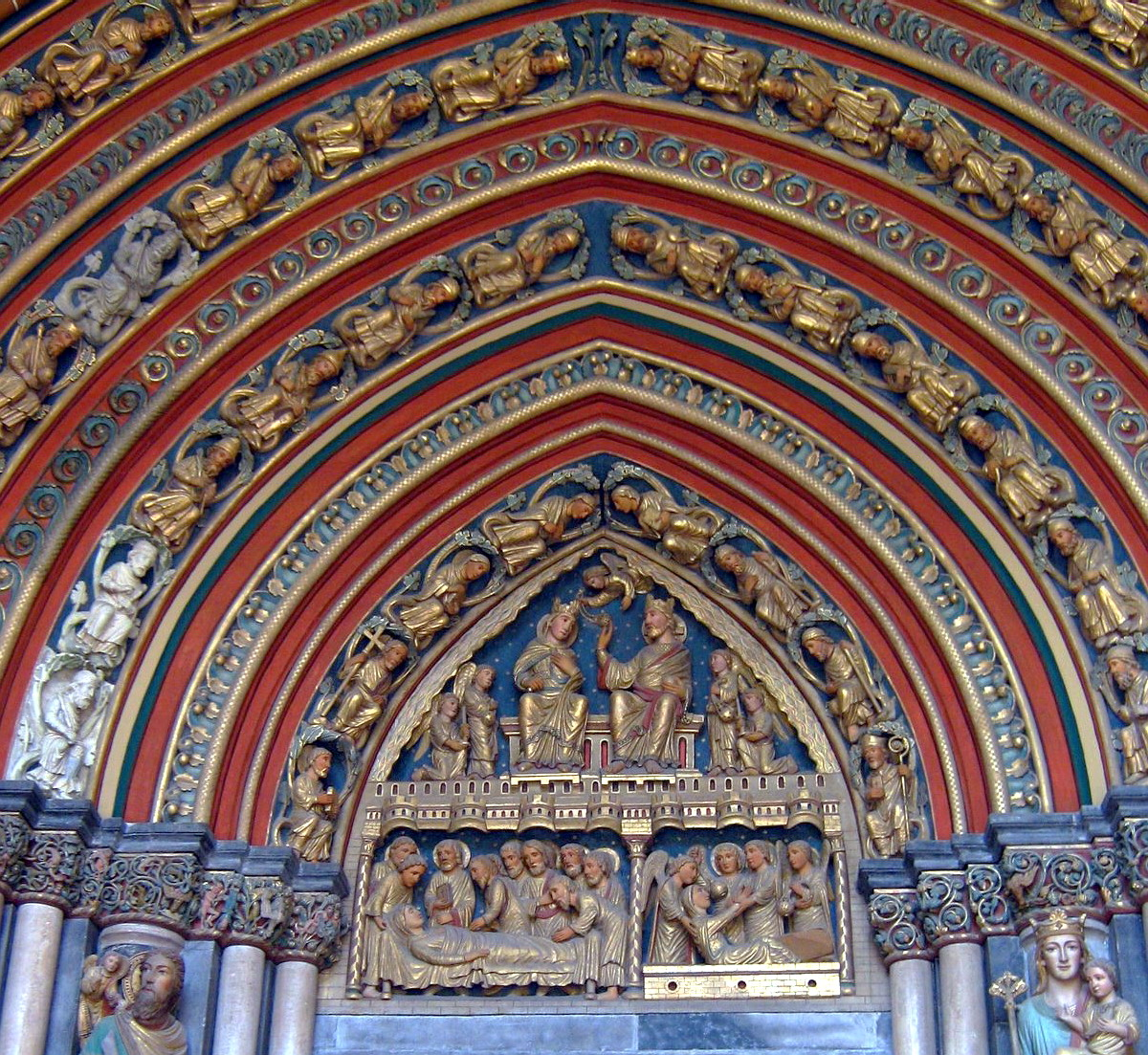
South portal (detail)

=== Treasury ===
Since the donation of a silver reliquary in the shape of a Roman triumphal arch by Charlemagne's biographer Einhard in c. 830, the church has acquired many treasures, most of which are now kept in the Treasury. Amongst the highlights are the Shrine of Saint Servatius, the Bust of Saint Servatius, the Key of Saint Servatius, the cup, the crozier and the pectoral cross of Saint Servatius, furthermore a large patriarchal cross, and many other reliquaries and liturgical vessels, as well as important collections of medieval ivories and textiles.

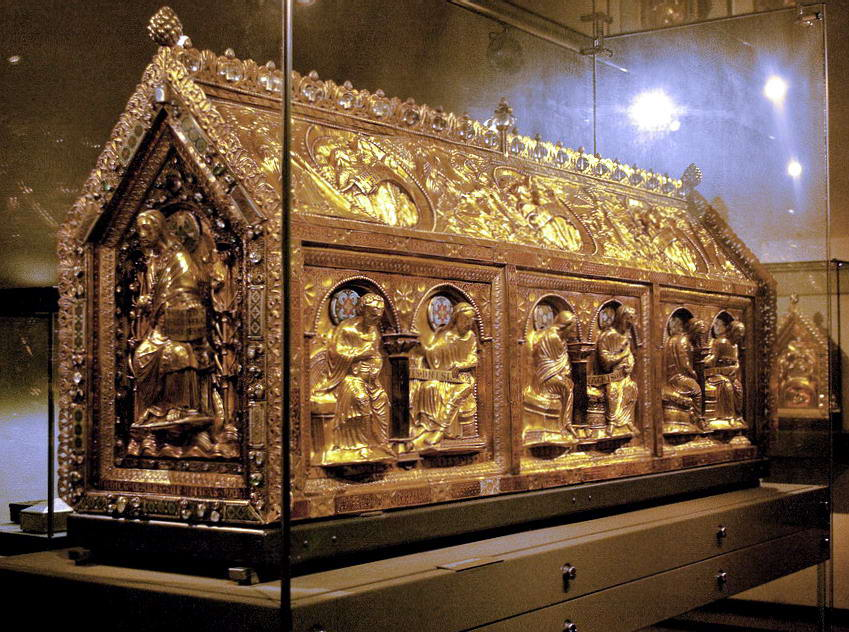
Shrine of Saint Servatius (Noodkist), 12th century

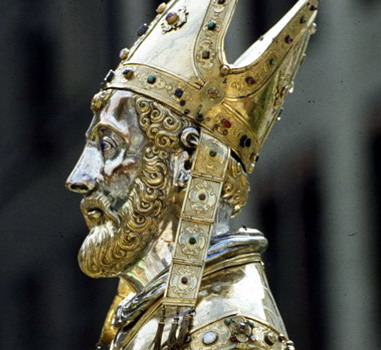
Bust of St Servatius, 1400s/1580s

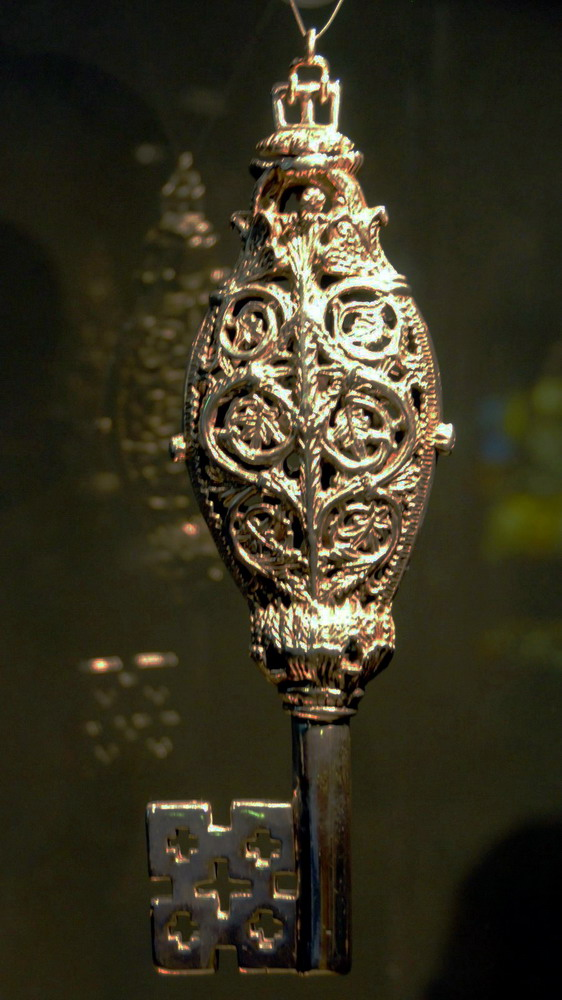
Key of St Servatius, 9th century

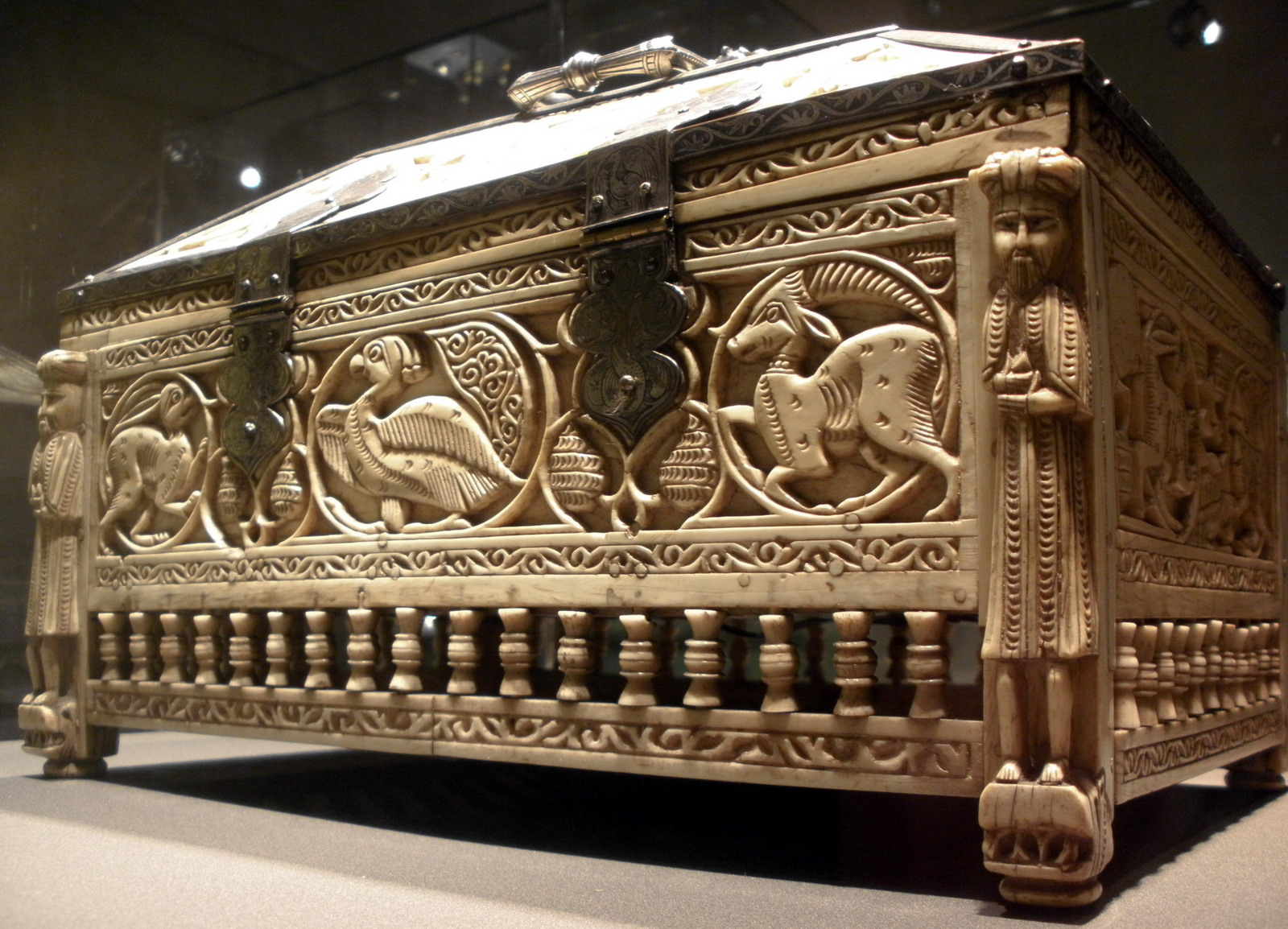
Ivory chest, 11th century

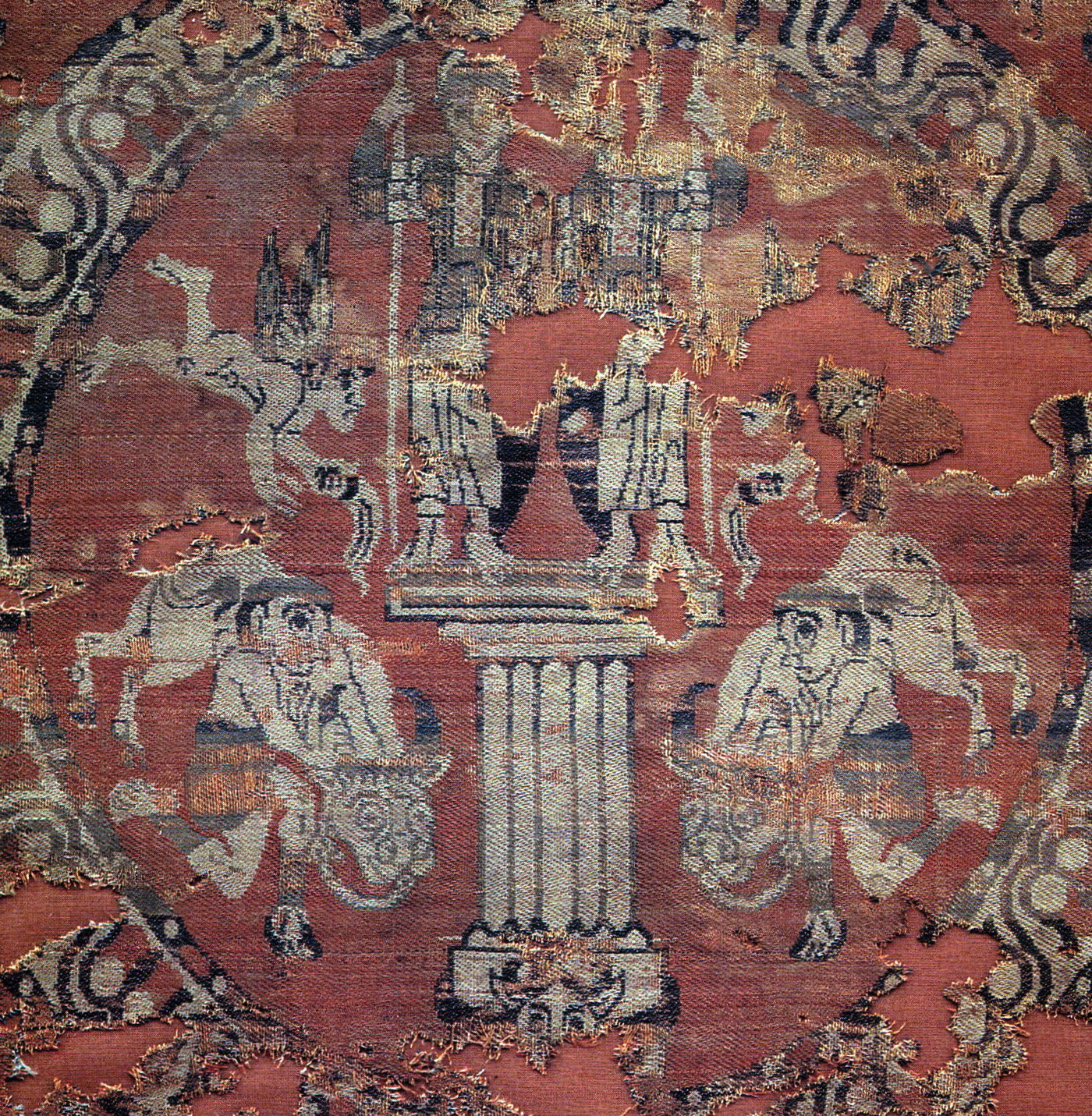
Silk cloth, 7th/8th century

== Sources and footnotes ==
- Elizabeth den Hartog: Romanesque Sculpture in Maastricht. Maastricht, 2002
- A.M. Koldeweij: Der gude Sente Servas. Assen/Maastricht, 1985
- Aart J.J. Mekking: De Sint-Servaaskerk te Maastricht. Utrecht/Zutphen, 1986
