= Hanover Monastic Chamber =

Authority within Lower Saxon Ministry of Science and Culture

- Klosterkammer Hannover
- Founder: Prince regent George of Hanover
- Legal status: State authority and foundation organ in the service area of the Ministry of Science and Culture of Lower Saxony
- Purpose: Foundation goals "church", "school" and "charitable purposes of any kind"
- Headquarters: Hanover
- President: Hans-Christian Biallas
- Staff: 135
- Website: www.klosterkammer.de
- Building details
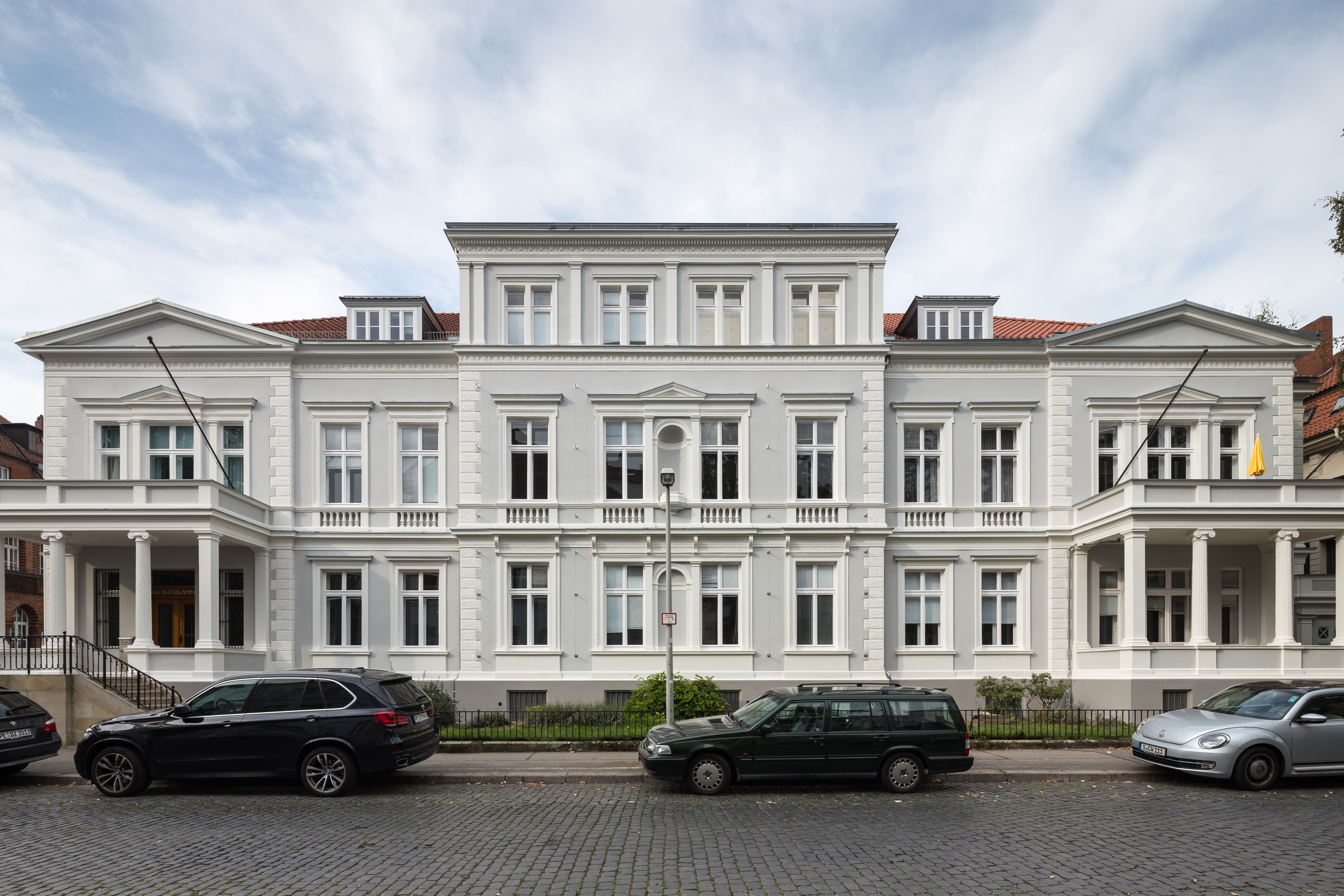
- Listed headquarters of the chamber in Hanover, façade facing Uhlemeyerstraße

General information
- Location: Eichstraße 4, Hanover, Lower Saxony, Germany
- Coordinates: 52.37814°N 9.75219°E

The Hanover Monastic Chamber (German: Klosterkammer Hannover) is a special authority based in Hanover within the scope of the Ministry of Science and Culture of Lower Saxony. It administers former ecclesiastical, mediatized property and maintains churches and convents. In addition, as a foundation body (Stiftungsorgan), it administers four independent foundations under public law.

The chamber maintains and promotes church, social and educational projects. It is one of the oldest and most traditional state authorities in Lower Saxony, whose forerunner organisation was founded in the 16th century.

== History ==
The chamber was founded during the time of the sovereign church regiment, when state and church were still institutionally linked before separation of powers. It has its roots in the time of the Reformation in the Principality of Calenberg-Göttingen around 1542, when the regent Elisabeth von Calenberg ordered an inventory of the documents of the former Catholic convents, which had been converted to Protestant ladies' foundations during the Reformation. This was only carried out to a limited extent. After the reign of Elisabeth of Calenberg ended in 1545 due to the majority of her son Eric II, the reformation of the convents came to a halt, as Erich II had converted to the Catholic faith. It was only after his death in 1584, when the Principality of Calenberg-Göttingen fell to Braunschweig-Wolfenbüttel in inheritance, that under Duke Julius the monastic system was reorganised according to the Wolfenbüttel Church Constitution of 1569.

The General Hanoverian Monastery Fund (Allgemeine Hannoversche Klosterfonds), the predecessor organisation, experienced a significant increase in assets as a result of the Reichsdeputationshauptschluss in 1803, when the Prince-bishoprics of Hildesheim and Osnabrück were dissolved and added to the Kingdom of Hanover in 1815. The assets of the dissolved convents were not confiscated by the state, but were transferred to the fund. This increase in assets was the reason for the establishment of the chamber as the central authority. Prince regent George IV set it up on 8 May 1818 to administer the former convent assets. During the time of the Prussian Province of Hanover from 1866 to 1945, the chamber, with its own president, was subordinate to the chief president of the province.

Numerous former collegiate and convent churches in Lower Saxony are still owned by the Hanover Monastic Chamber, although they are used by Protestant and Catholic parishes as parish churches. In addition, there are extensive properties of the former convents. The president of the chamber is responsible for representing the respective prelatures at the Calenberg-Grubenhagen Landtag.

== Administration and real estate ==
The chamber is located in the Oststadt (East Town) of Hanover, not far from the Hanover University of Music, Drama and Media (Hochschule für Musik, Theater und Medien Hannover). It administers the Allgemeine Hannoversche Klosterfonds (AHK), the Domstrukturfonds Verden (Verden Cathedral Structure Fund), the Stift Ilfeld (Ilfeld Abbey) and the Hospitalfonds St. Benedikti in Lüneburg (St. Benedict Hospital Fund in Lüneburg).

The Hanover Monastic Chamber has an administrative, a real estate and a building department as well as the chamber forest business, which is managed by the convent forest offices in Soltau and Westerhof, as a state enterprise. There are about 135 employees who look after the extensive foundation assets. This consists mainly of around 40,000 hectares (99,000 acres) of land with agricultural and forest areas, gravel pits, nature conservation and leisure areas. Three quarters of the Klosterkammer is financed by almost 16,000 leasehold properties. In addition, the Chamber owns about 800 buildings, most of which are listed, including the Calenberg nunneries of Barsinghausen, Mariensee, Marienwerder, Wennigsen and Wülfinghausen. It also owns about 10,000 works of art.

== Activity ==
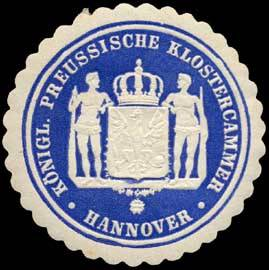
Seal Mark of the Royal Prussian Klosterkammer Hannover

The administration of the four foundation assets by the Hanover Monastic Chamber also includes the fulfilment of performance obligations towards numerous Protestant and Catholic parishes. In the vast majority of cases, these obligations have always been borne by the assets of the foundations, in particular the AHK. An initial list is found in Falk's memorandum of 1877, the size of which varies considerably. In the case of the parish of St. Michaelis Lüneburg, for example, the AHK is obliged to bear the entire costs of the parish (i.e., all personnel, material and building maintenance costs). In other cases, the AHK bears all or part of the parish pay and the construction maintenance of church buildings, rectories and cemetery chapels. In addition, the AHK provides subsidies for salaries and heating costs. Based on a contractual agreement of 1963–83 with the State of Lower Saxony, the AHK bears the performance obligation of the state of Lower Saxony towards the so-called Lüneburg abbeys (i.e., Damenstiften, Ebstorf, Isenhagen, Lüne, Medingen, Walsrode and Wienhausen). In return, the AHK was released from its obligation to pay benefits to the University of Göttingen and the excess claim was compensated by the transfer of agricultural and forestry assets. In addition, the chamber advises the convent foundations of Bassum, Börstel, Fischbeck and Obernkirchen in administrative, building and other specialist matters.

From the economic surpluses of the asset management, the Hanover Monastic Chamber allocates subsidies of about €3 million annually for projects in Lower Saxony in accordance with the ecclesiastical, social and educational purpose of the foundation.

== Managed monasteries and convents ==
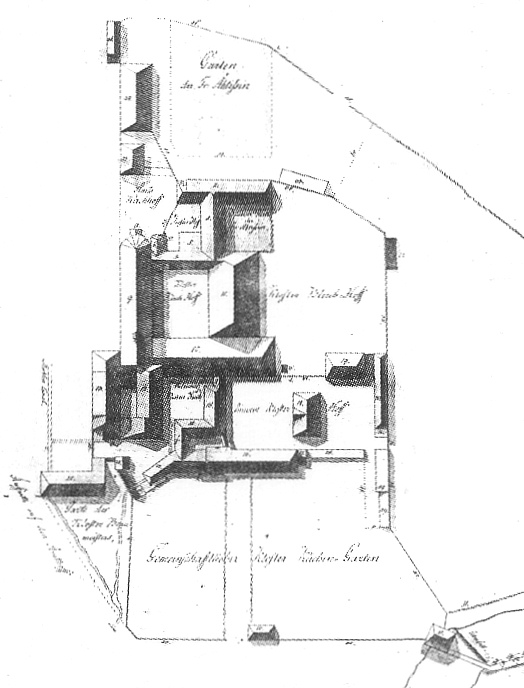
Ground plan of the Lüne Abbey around 1800

=== Lüneburg monasteries ===
1. Lüne Monastery
2. Ebstorf Monastery
3. Isenhagen Monastery
4. Medingen Monastery
5. Walsrode Monastery
6. Wienhausen Monastery

=== Calenberg monasteries ===
1. Barsinghausen Monastery
2. Mariensee Monastery
3. Marienwerder Monastery
4. Wennigsen Monastery
5. Wülfinghausen Monastery

=== Feldklöster (Field monasteries) ===
1. Grauhof Monastery
2. Riechenberg Monastery
3. St Peter and Paul (Heiningen)
4. Lamspringe Monastery
5. Wöltingerode Monastery

=== Other ===
1. Minster Church of St. Alexandri (Einbeck)
2. Fischbeck Monastery
3. Obernkirchen Monastery
4. Börstel Monastery
5. Bassum Monastery
6. Ilfeld Abbey with the Ilfeld monastery school and more than 1,500 hectares (3,700 acres) of forest in the Nordhausen district of Thuringia
7. Bursfelde Monastery

== Directors and Presidents ==
- Georg von der Wense (1818–1830), Geh. Kammerrat (Privy chamber councillor)
- Philipp von Lochhausen (1830–1851), Oberklosterrat (Superior convent councillor)
- Friedrich Hermann Albert von Wangenheim (1851–1861), Klosterkammerdirektor (Director of the Klosterkammer)
- Heinrich Christian Georg Haccius (1862–1874), Klosterkammerdirektor
- Georg Wilhelm Niemeyer (1875–1877), Klosterkammerdirektor
- Louis Sauerhering (1877–1889)
- Walther Herwig (1889–1901)
- Franz Rotzoll (1901–1921)
- Martin Richter (1921–1930)
- Albrecht Stalmann (1931–1955)
- Helmut Bojunga (1955–1958)
- Theodor Parisius (1959–1961)
- Hans Helmut zur Nedden (1961–1968)
- Herbert Weyher (1968–1970)
- Rolf Hauer (1970–1979)
- Axel Freiherr von Campenhausen (1979–1999)
- Martha Jansen (1999–2002)
- 2003 vacancy
- Sigrid Maier-Knapp-Herbst (2004–2011)
- Hans-Christian Biallas (2011–2022)

== General references ==
- Axel Freiherr von Campenhausen (ed.): Der Allgemeine Hannoversche Klosterfonds und die Klosterkammer Hannover. Schlüter, Hanover 1999, ISBN 3-87706-546-5.
- Andreas Franitza: Der Allgemeine Hannoversche Klosterfonds und die Klosterkammer Hanover. Untersuchungen zur rechtsgeschichtlichen Entwicklung (= Schriften zum Staatskirchenrecht 2), Frankfurt am Main a.o. (2000).
- Klosterkammer Hannover (publisher): Klostergüter. Ein niedersächsisches Erbe. Hinstorff, Rostock 2011, ISBN 978-3-356-01396-2.
