= Westerhoff =

Westerhoff is a surname. Notable people with the surname include:

- Gay-Yee Westerhoff (born 1973), Chinese-English cellist
- Hans Westerhoff (born 1953), Dutch biologist and biochemist
- Jan Westerhoff, American philosopher and Orientalist
- Rembertus Westerhoff (1801-1874), Dutch politician, Thorbeckian Member of Parliament (1849-1873), general practitioner, scholar, first testator of the Groninger Museum

== See also ==
- Westerhof
