= Fischbeck Abbey =

Monastery in Fischbeck, Lower Saxony, Germany

Coordinates: 52°08′31″N 9°17′50″E

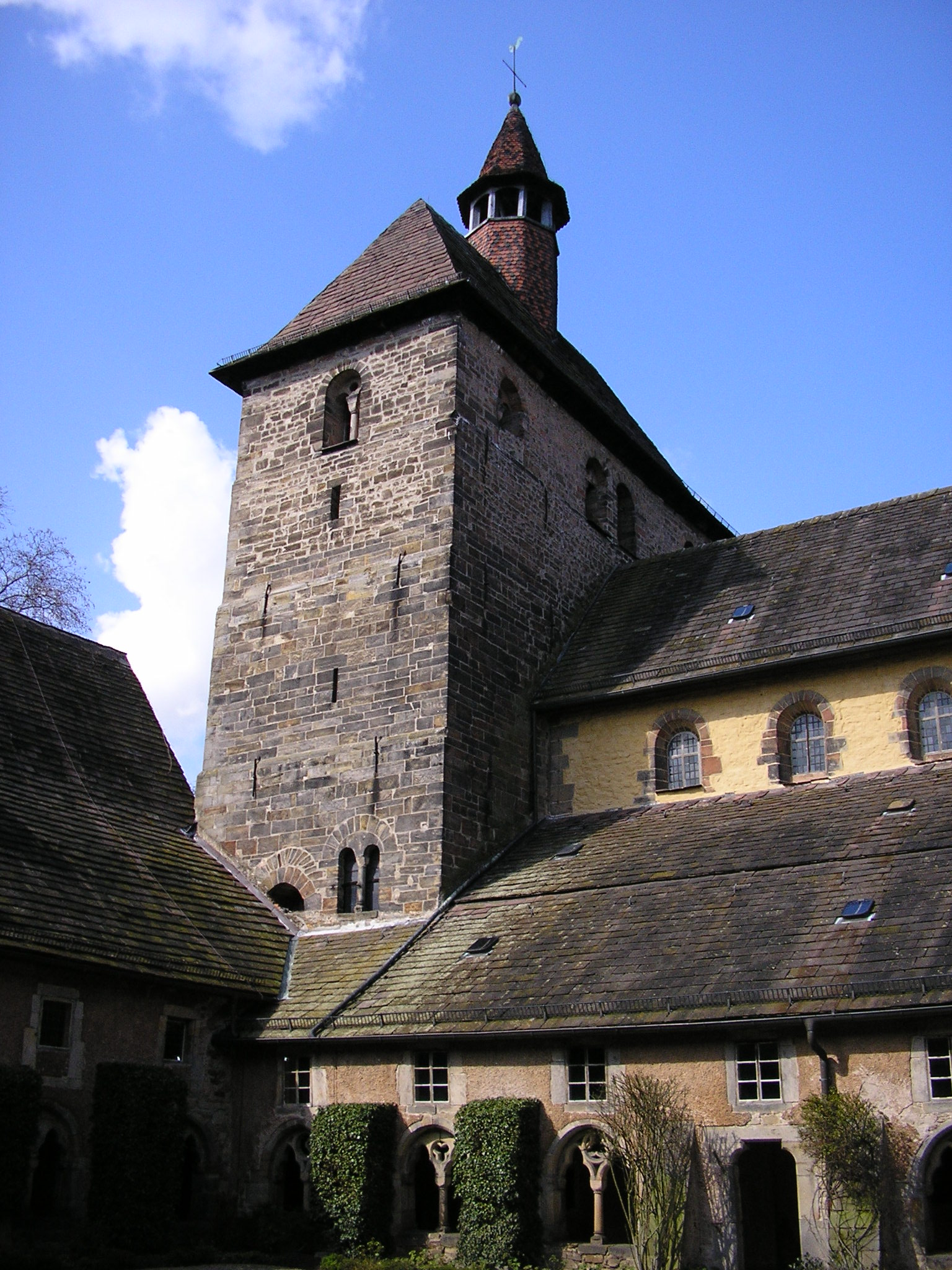
Fischbeck Abbey.

Fischbeck Abbey (German: Stift Fischbeck) is an Evangelical-Lutheran convent for canonesses in Fischbeck near Hessisch Oldendorf, Lower Saxony, Germany.

It was founded in 955 by the noblewoman Helmburgis, a relation of the powerful family of the Ecbertiner, on land that had been given to her for the purpose by King Otto I, and is still a house of canonesses today, although now Lutheran women's convent rather than a Roman Catholic monastery.

Despite later repairs and refurbishments, the cloisters and the church, built mostly in the 12th and 13th centuries, are still basically Romanesque.

In the abbey church is a tapestry made in 1583, which portrays the foundation of the abbey in six panels. In the 1950s the author Manfred Hausmann was inspired by the tapestry to write the dramatic piece "Der Fischbecker Wandteppich" (The Tapestry of Fischbeck), which has been performed in the abbey church at Fischbeck several times.

== Sources ==
- Stift Fischbeck official website (in German)
- David Zersen. "Lutheran Convents in Germany." Lutheran Forum. Vol. 48. No. 1, Spring 2014.
