= Preetz Priory =

Former nunnery in Schleswig-Holstein, Germany

Coordinates: 54°14′25.34″N 10°16′59.77″E

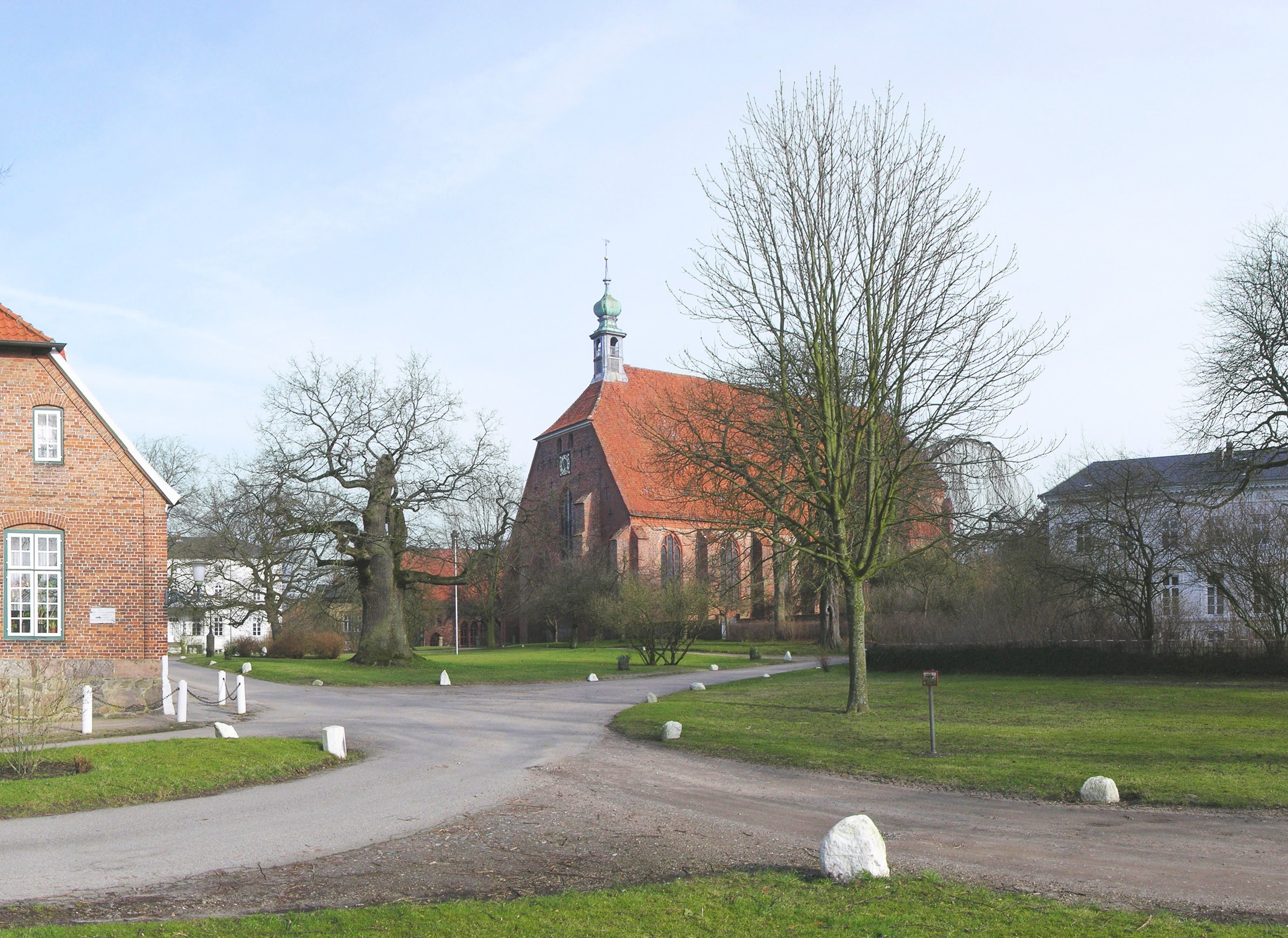
Preetz Priory

Preetz Priory (German: Kloster Preetz) is a former Benedictine nunnery in the town of Preetz, Schleswig-Holstein, Germany. It operates today as a collegiate residence for ladies (Stift).

== History ==
The nunnery was founded in 1211 by Graf Albrecht of Orlamünde, nephew of King Valdemar II of Denmark, following a mystical experience which, according to him, happened while he was stalking a deer. After he had followed it into a valley, the deer stood still and he suddenly saw a gleaming cross appear between its antlers. He felt that the site was a holy place which he called the Field of Mary (German: Marienfelde) and to commemorate the vision he founded a nunnery at a location some 2 miles (4 km) away. A monastery on the actual site of the vision was built only in 1260.

Suppressed in the 16th century due to the Protestant Reformation, it became an aristocratic Lutheran women's convent belonging to the Schleswig-Holstein knighthood. It continues in this capacity.
