= Hans-Christian Biallas =

German politician (1956–2022)

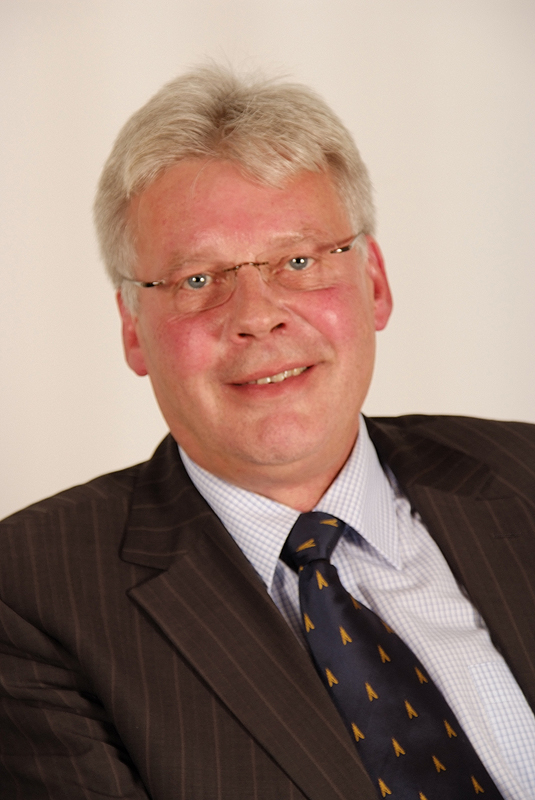
- Biallas in 2009
- Born: 26 December 1956; Hanover, Germany
- Died: 27 February 2022 (aged 65)
- Occupations: Protestant theologian; Politician
- Organizations: Klosterkammer Hannover

Hans-Christian Biallas (26 December 1956 – 27 February 2022) was a German politician and Protestant theologian. He was the president of the Klosterkammer Hannover of Lower Saxony.

== Life ==
Biallas attended schools in Soltau and Buxtehude, and then studied Protestant theology in Göttingen, Kiel and Amsterdam. He began work as a vicar in Preetz in 1981, and was from 1983 to 1994 pastor in Cuxhaven-Altenbruch.

=== Politics ===
Biallas joined the CDU in 1992. From 1996, he was at times a member of the municipal council of Cuxhaven. From 1994 to 2011, he served as a member of the Landtag of Lower Saxony.

=== Klosterkammer Hannover ===
The state government appointed him president of the Klosterkammer Hannover as of 1 June 2011, succeeding Sigrid Maier-Knapp-Herbst. He held the position until his death.

=== Private life ===
Biallas was divorced and had three children. He died on 27 February 2022 at age 65.
