= Imperial church =

Church associated with an empire

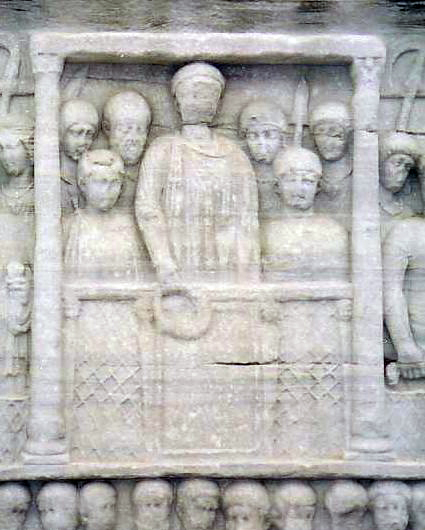
A mural commemorating Emperor Theodosius I in Istanbul

An imperial church is a church associated with an empire. The first such church was the state church of the Roman Empire, as patronized and largely controlled by the Roman Emperors from the time of the transfer of the seat of government to Constantinople. The link between the church within that empire and the state was formally established by Theodosius I with the Edict of Thessalonica of 27 February 380.

There was the imperial church of the Spanish Empire, as described in the chapter The Course of the Imperial Church from Imposition to Eclipse of the book The Church in Latin America 1492-1992 by Enrique Dussel.

The term imperial church has been used also with reference to a vision of the Church of England as the church of the British Empire.

In her book The Church on the Margins: Living Christian Community, Mary R. Sawyer uses the term imperial church to mean any church that supports domination by some over others. She thus describes the church, after the conversion of Constantine, as one that "evolved as a hierarchical, patriarchal, and episcopal institution in which the charismatic, or spiritual, expression of Christianity was suppressed. Christianity became not only the 'state' religion but an imperial religion."

== See also ==
- Caesaropapism
- Charlemagne
- Christianity and politics
- Divine right of kings
- Donation of Constantine
- Ecumenical Council
- Eusebius of Caesarea
- Henry VIII of England
- Justinian I
- Phyletism
- Religious nationalism
- Separation of church and state
- State religion
- Symphonia (theology)
- Theodosius I
- Temporal power (papal)
- Two kingdoms doctrine
