= Dwarf gallery =

Architectural feature

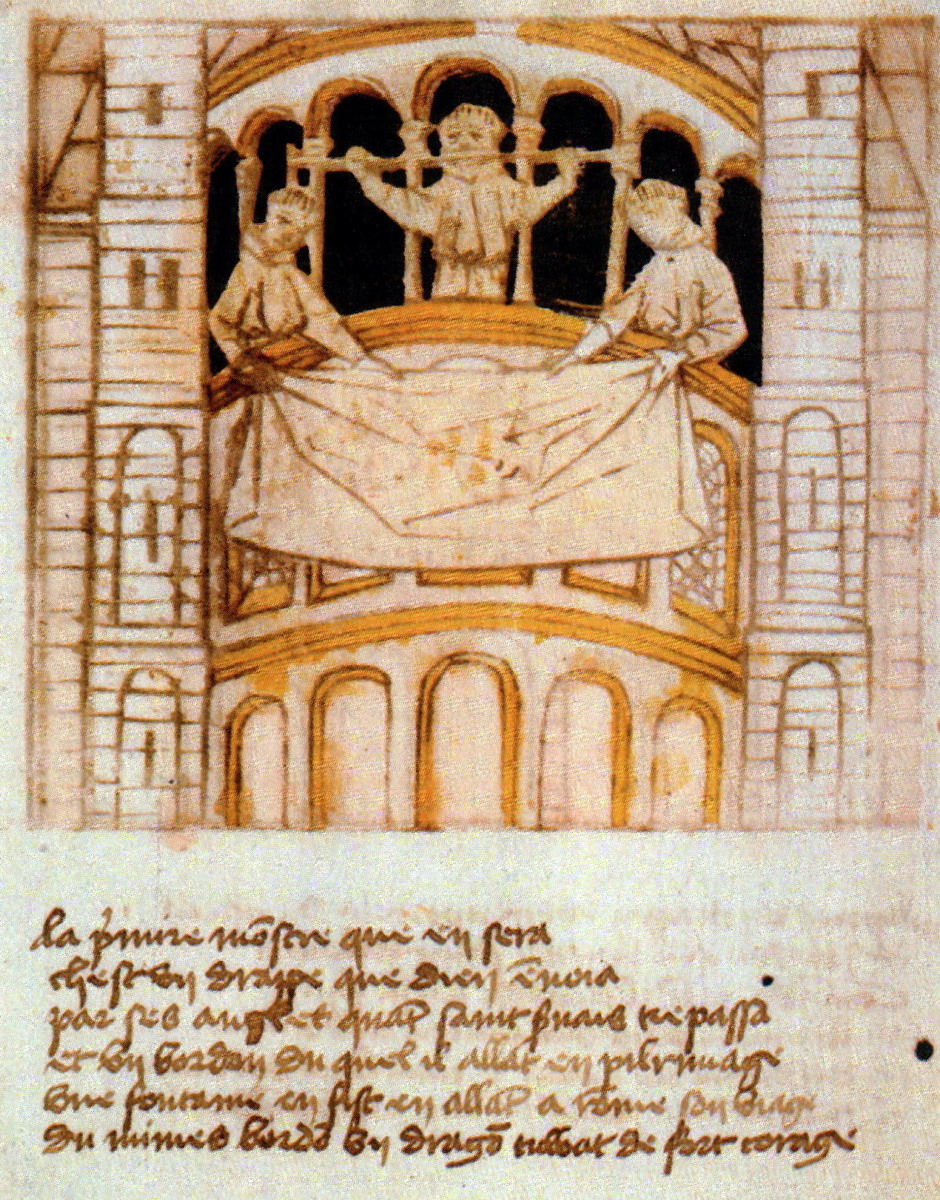
Relics being shown from the dwarf gallery of St Servatius' in Maastricht during the Septennial Pilgrimage (Blokboek van St Servaas, ±1460)

A dwarf gallery is an architectural ornament in Romanesque architecture.

It is a natural development of the blind arcade and consists of an arcaded gallery, usually just below the roof, recessed into the thickness of the walls. Usually dwarf galleries can be found at church towers or apses but they frequently appear at other parts of buildings as well, or even go around the entire building. Although principally meant as a decorative element, some dwarf galleries can be used. During the septennial Pilgrimage of the Relics in Maastricht, relics were shown daily from the dwarf gallery of St Servatius' to pilgrims gathered in front of the church in Vrijthof.

Dwarf galleries mainly appear at Romanesque churches in Germany and Italy. A few examples can be found in Belgium and the Netherlands (see Mosan art). Remarkably, in France no dwarf galleries were built. The oldest church in Germany with a dwarf gallery is Trier Cathedral. The apsis with dwarf gallery at Speyer Cathedral, described as “one of the most memorable pieces of Romanesque design”, was copied in many other places in the German Rhineland. Several of Cologne's twelve Romanesque churches feature dwarf galleries, as well as important Rhineland churches like Mainz Cathedral, Worms Cathedral and Bonn Minster.

In Italy, dwarf galleries appear at churches in the central and northern regions of the country. Examples are Santa Maria della Pieve in Arezzo, Modena Cathedral, Pistoia Cathedral, San Donato in Genoa and Pisa Cathedral. The famous Leaning Tower of Pisa could be described as having six rings of dwarf galleries.

In France, simple dwarf galleries are rare. But there was a luxurious development. In some façades, sculptures were placed between the columns. Most famous are the Galleries of Kings (Galeries des Rois) on Notre-Dame de Paris and the Cathedral of Amiens.

Dwarf galleries incidentally feature in Romanesque Revival architecture, notably in Germany, but also in other parts of the world.

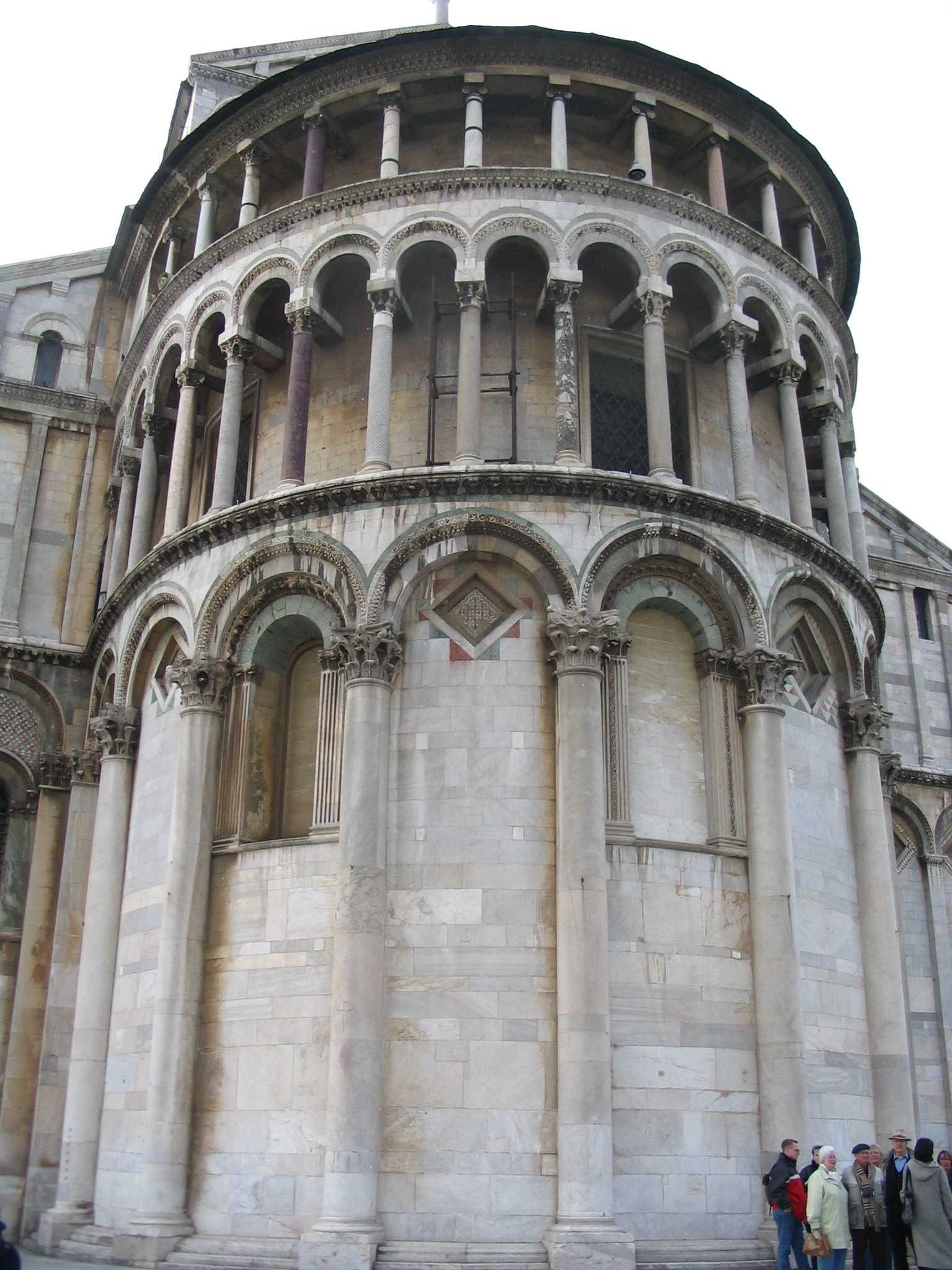
Pisa Cathedral

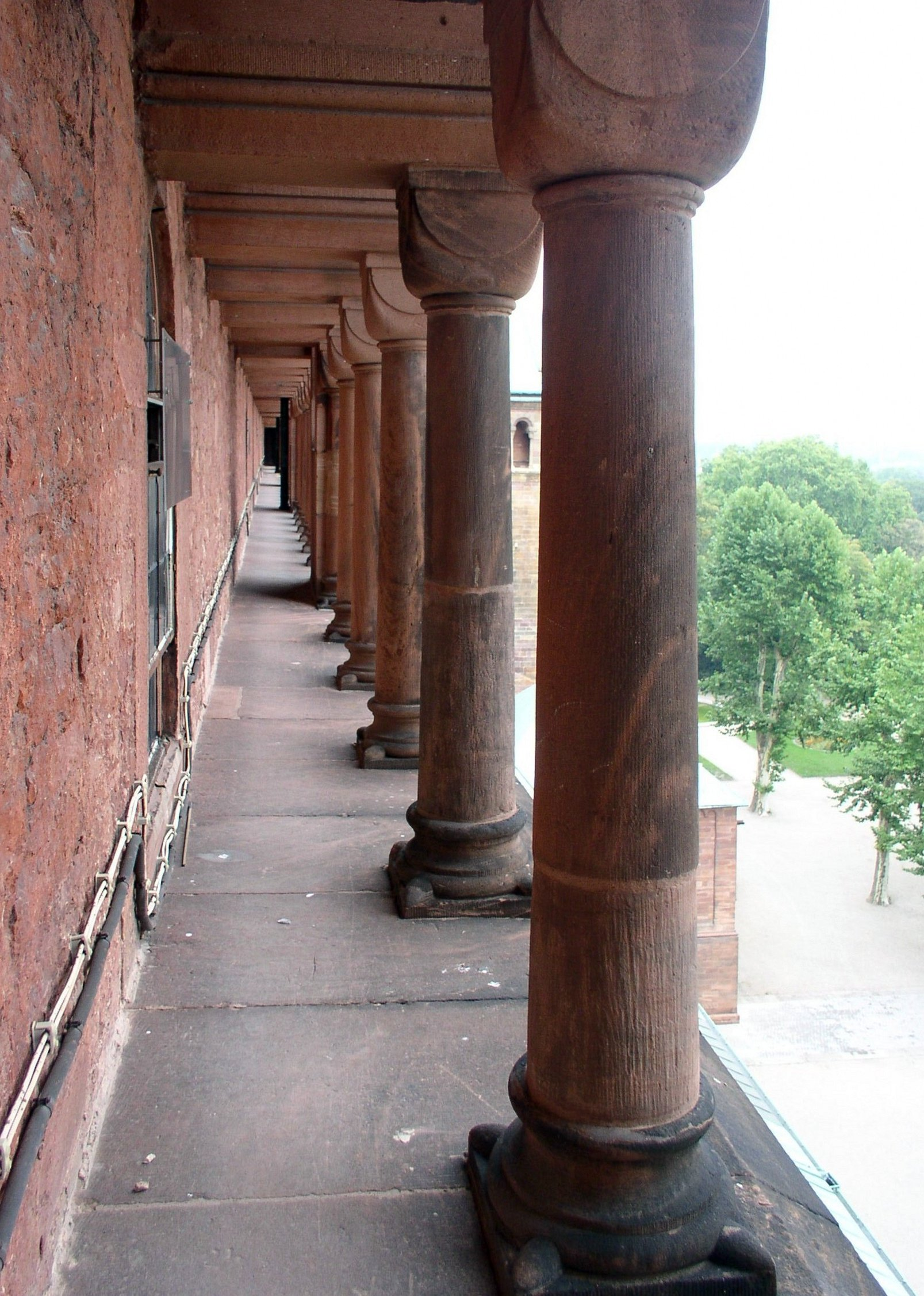
Speyer Cathedral

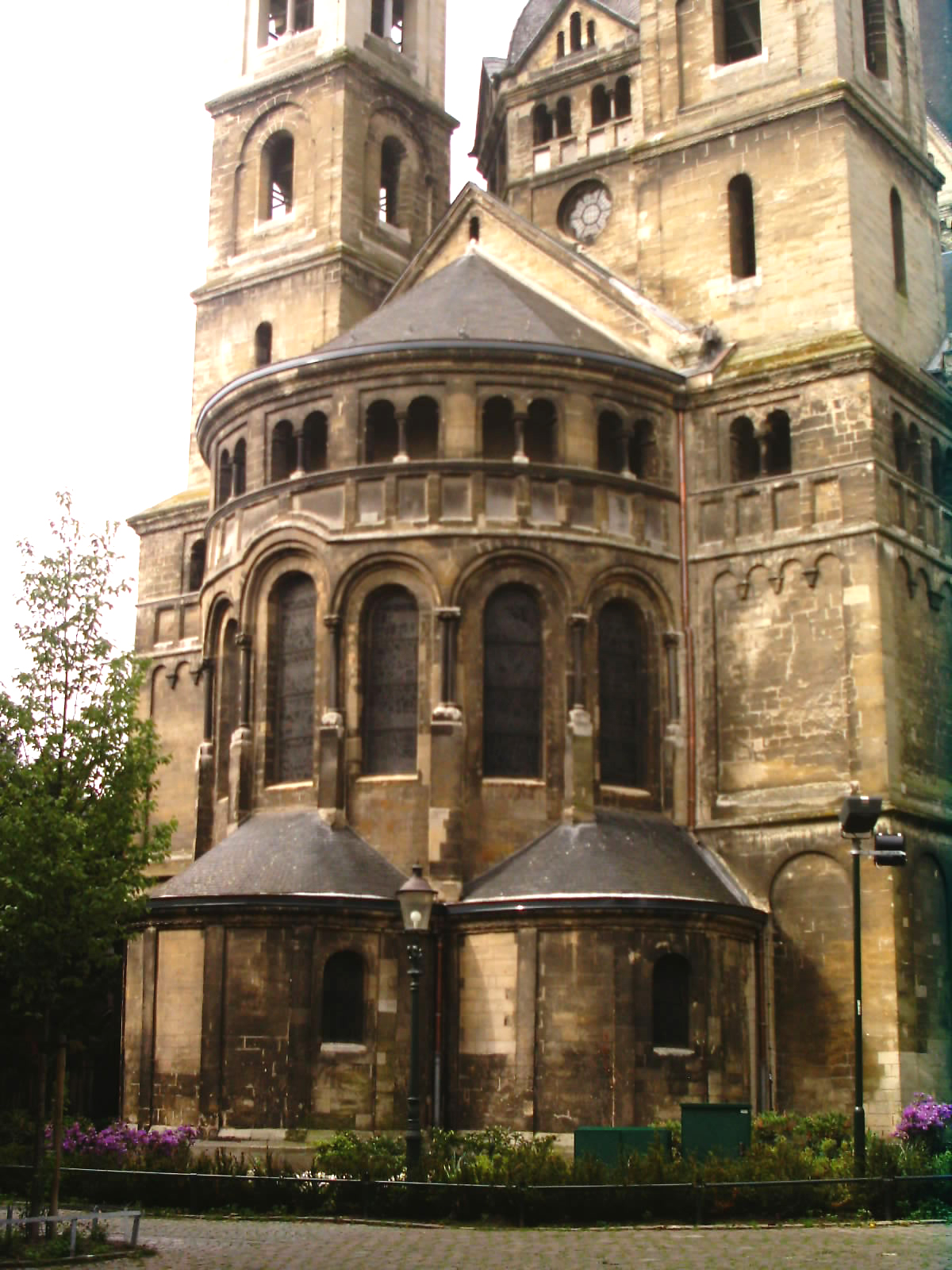
Roermond, Minster

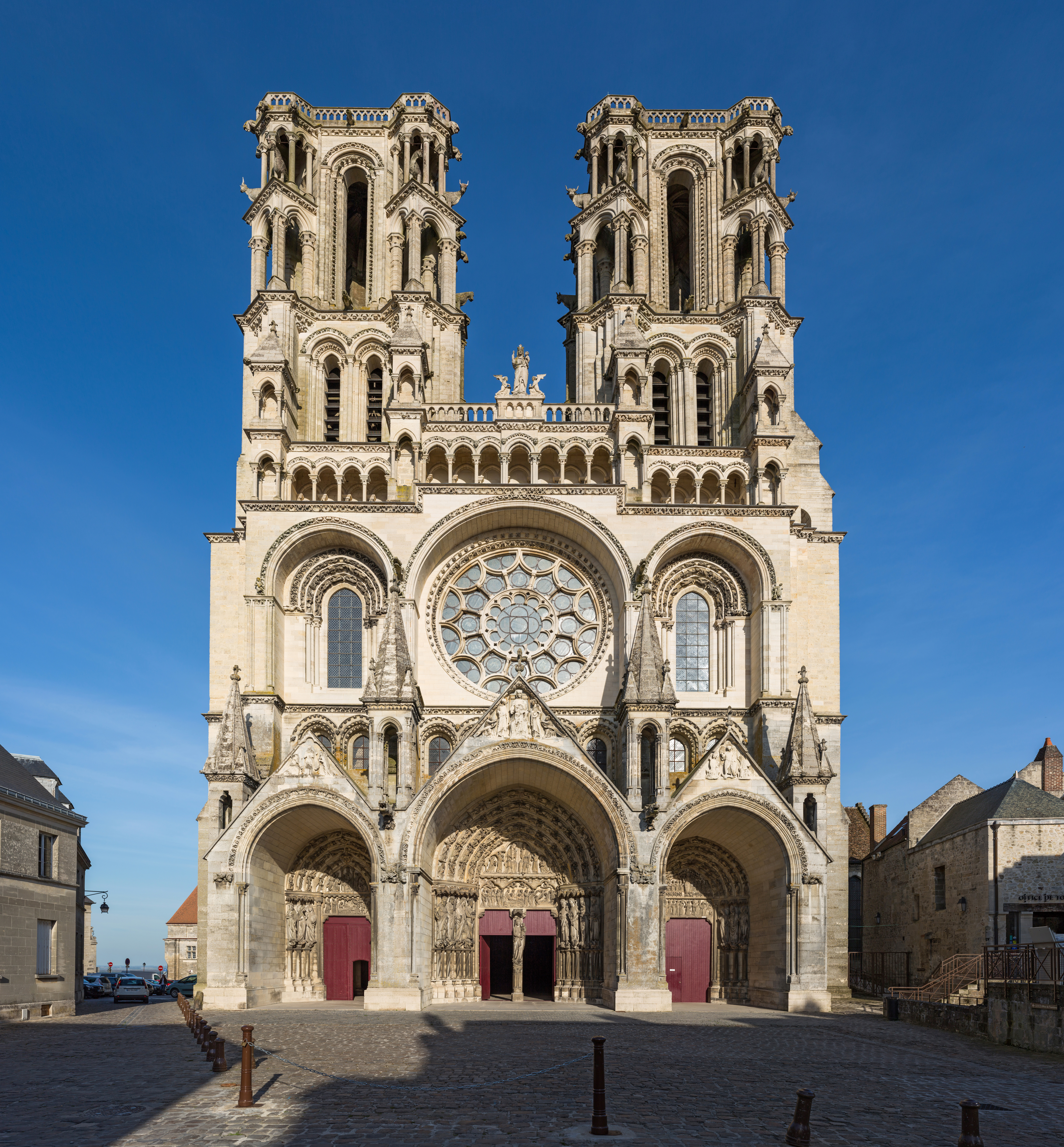
Laon Cathedral

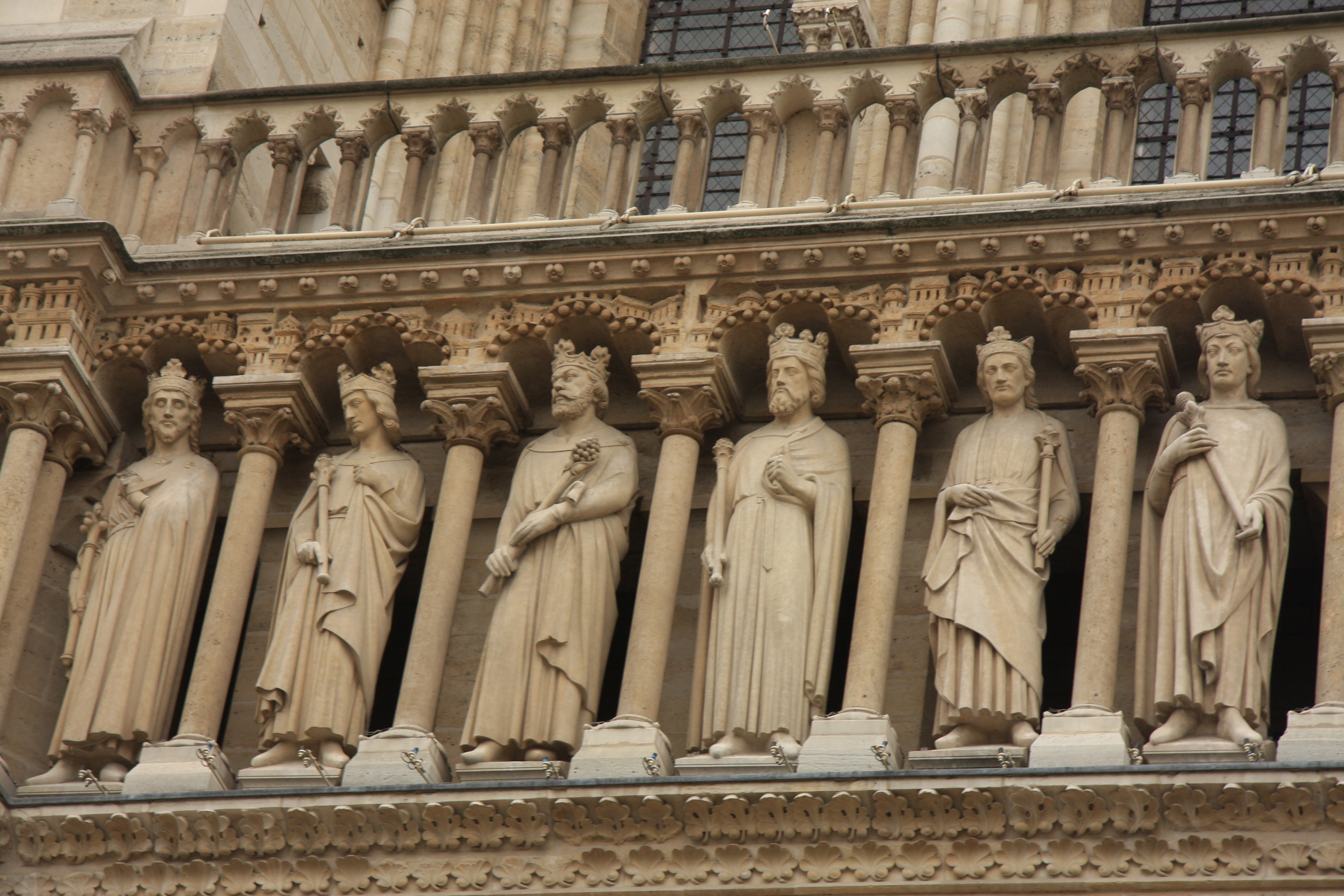
Gallery of Kings on Notre-Dame de Paris

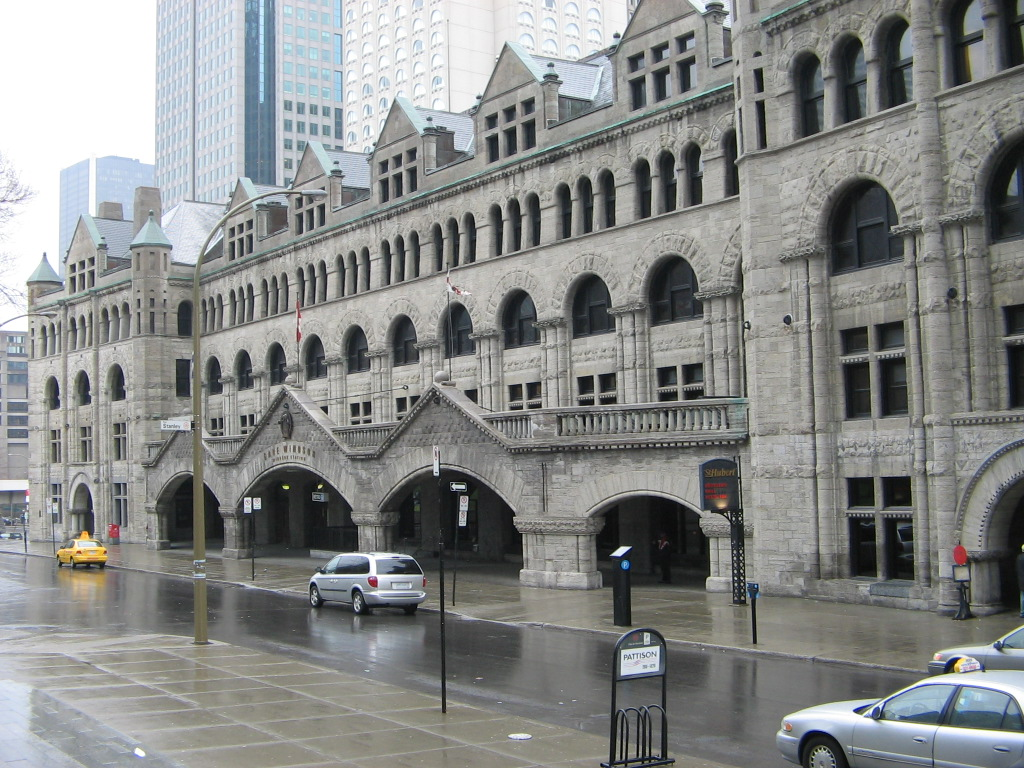
Montreal, Windsor station
