= Stift =

Charitable religious organization

The term Stift (German: [ˈʃtɪft]; Dutch: sticht) is derived from the verb stiften (to donate) and originally meant 'a donation'. Such donations usually comprised earning assets, originally landed estates with serfs defraying dues (originally often in kind) or with vassal tenants of noble rank providing military services and forwarding dues collected from serfs. In modern times the earning assets could also be financial assets donated to form a fund to maintain an endowment, especially a charitable foundation. When landed estates, donated as a Stift to maintain the college of a monastery, the chapter of a collegiate church or the cathedral chapter of a diocese, formed a territory enjoying the status of an imperial state within the Holy Roman Empire then the term Stift often also denotes the territory itself. In order to specify this territorial meaning the term Stift is then composed with hoch as the compound Hochstift, denoting a prince-bishopric, or Erzstift for a prince-archbishopric.

== Endowment ==
Das Stift [plural die Stifte] (literally, the 'donation'), denotes in its original meaning the donated or else acquired fund of landed estates whose revenues are taken to maintain a college and the pertaining church (Stiftskirche, i.e. collegiate church) and its collegiate or capitular canons (Stiftsherr[en]) or canonesses (Stiftsfrau[en]). Many Stifte as endowments were secularised in Protestant countries in the course of the Reformation, or later in revolutionary France and the areas later annexed to or influenced by Napoleonic France.

=== Ecclesiastical endowment ===
Some Stifte survived and still form the endowments of modern mostly Catholic monasteries, then often called "Stift X", such as Stift Melk. Stift is often used – pars pro toto – as a synonym for an endowed monastery. If the Stift endowment belongs to a collegiate church it is sometimes called Kollegiatsstift. If the Stift as a fund served or serves to maintain the specific college of a cathedral (a so-called cathedral chapter) then the Stift is often called das Domstift (i.e. 'cathedral donation [fund]'). However, since Dom (like the Italian Duomo) is in German an expression for churches with a college, thus actual cathedrals and collegiate churches alike, Domstifte also existed with collegiate churches not being cathedrals, like with the Supreme Parish and Collegiate Church in Berlin, now often translated as Berlin Cathedral, though it never was the seat of a bishop, but endowed with a Domstift (in German Dom, as the Italian Duomo, is the main church of a town or a city, not always a Cathedral).

=== Endowment for unmarried Protestant women ===
In some Lutheran states the endowments of women's monasteries were preserved, with the nunneries converted into secular convents in order to maintain unmarried or widowed noble women (the so-called conventuals, German: Konventualinnen), therefore called ladies' foundations (Damenstift) or noble damsels' foundations (Danish: Adelige Jomfrukloster, German: [Adeliges] Fräuleinstift, Swedish: Jungfrustift). Many of these convents were dissolved in Communist countries after the Second World War, but, in Denmark and the former West Germany, many continue to exist, such as the Stift Fischbeck. In Lower Saxony the former endowments of many Lutheran women's convents are collectively administered by the Klosterkammer Hannover, a governmental department, while others maintain their endowments independently or their endowments are administered by a collective body consisting of the noble families of a former principality (e.g. Neuenwalde Convent or Preetz Priory). Some of these charitable institutions which previously accepted only female members of noble families now also accept residents from other social classes.

=== General charitable endowment ===
Many secular or religious ancient or modern charitable endowments of earning assets in order to maintain hospitals or homes for the elderly, for orphans, for widows, for the poor, for the blind or for people with other handicaps bear the name Stift, often combined with the name of the main donators or the beneficiaries, such as Altenstift (endowment for the elderly; see e.g. Cusanusstift, a hospital).

=== Educational endowment ===
Similar to the English development, where canon-law colleges with their endowments became sometimes the nuclei for secular educational colleges the former Augustinian collegiate endowment in Tübingen is maintained until today as the Tübinger Stift, a foundation of the Lutheran Evangelical State Church in Württemberg for the theological education. The Catholic church has similar institutions, such as the Wilhelmsstift, also in Tübingen. A modern example is the Freies Deutsches Hochstift, which despite the term Hochstift is not ecclesiastical, but a civic charitable establishment maintaining the Goethe House in Frankfurt upon Main.

=== Collegial body or building ===
Das Stift is also used – totum pro parte – as the expression for the collegial body of persons (originally canons or canonesses) who administered it and for the building (compound) they used to meet or live in. If the Stift served or serves to maintain the specific college of a cathedral (a so-called cathedral chapter) then the building can be also called Domstift.

== Territorial entity ==
=== Territory of statehood ===
If a canon-law college or the chapter and/or the bishop of a cathedral managed not only to gain estates and their revenues as a Stift but also the feudal overlordship to them as a secular ruler with imperial recognition, then such ecclesiastical estates (temporalities) formed a territorial principality within the Holy Roman Empire with the rank of an imperial state. The secular territory comprising the donated landed estates (das Stift) was thus called das Hochstift (analogously translated as prince-bishopric) as opposed to an area of episcopal spiritual jurisdiction, called diocese (Bistum). The boundaries of secular prince-bishoprics did usually not correspond to that of the spiritual dioceses. Prince-bishoprics were always much smaller than the dioceses which included (parts of) neighbouring imperial states such as principalities of secular princes and Free Imperial Cities. Prince-bishoprics could also include areas belonging in ecclesiastical respect to other dioceses.

Hochstift (plural: Hochstifte) is a compound with hoch ('high') literally meaning 'a high [ranking ecclesiastical] endowment', whereas Erzstift, a compound with Erz- ('arch[i]-'), is the corresponding expression for a prince-archbishopric. For the three prince-electorates of Cologne (Kurköln), Mainz (Kurmainz) and Trier (Kurtrier), which were simultaneously archbishoprics the corresponding expression is Kurerzstift (electorate-archbishopric). The adjective pertaining to Stift as a territory is stiftisch ('of, pertaining to a prince-bishopric; prince-episcopal').

Similar developments as to statehood allowed a number of monasteries (the so-called imperial abbeys) or regular canon colleges (e.g. Berchtesgaden Provostry) with feudal overlordship to (part of) their estates to gain imperial recognition as a principality (Fürstentum) too.

Specific prince-bishoprics were often called Hochstift/Erzstift X, as in Hochstift Ermland or in Erzstift Bremen, with stiftbremisch meaning 'of/pertaining to the Prince-Archbishopric of Bremen', as opposed to stadtbremisch ('of/pertaining to the city of Bremen'). The spiritual entities, the dioceses, are called in German Bistum ('diocese') or Erzbistum ('archdiocese'). The difference between a Hochstift/Erzstift and a Bistum/Erzbistum is not always clear to authors so that texts, even scholarly ones, often translate Hochstift or Erzstift incorrectly simply as diocese/bishopric or archdiocese/archbishopric, respectively.

=== Ecclesiastical diocese ===
In Danish, Norwegian and Swedish the term stift was adopted as a loan word from German. In an ecclesiastical respect it simply denotes a diocese of a bishop.

=== Territorial subdivision ===
At times in Nordic countries, a stift formed an administrative jurisdiction under a Stiftamtmand (Danish).

=== Toponym ===
In the Netherlands the term Het Sticht is usually denoting the Prince-bishopric of Utrecht, which consisted of two separate parts (Oversticht and Nedersticht, i.e. upper and lower prince-bishopric) with other territories in between. The German corresponding terms are Oberstift and Niederstift.

- Electorate-Archbishopric of Cologne (Kurerzstift Köln):
  - Oberstift, southerly area west of the Rhine with Bonn and Brühl;
  - Niederstift, a more northerly, separate area with Rheinberg
- Electorate-Archbishopric of Mainz (Kurerzstift Mainz):
  - Oberstift, the easterly territorially separate Lower Franconian, Hessian and Thuringian part with Aschaffenburg and Erfurt
  - Niederstift, the westerly Rhenish part with Mainz
- Prince-Bishopric of Münster (Hochstift Münster):
  - Oberstift, the southerly Westphalian part with Münster in Westphalia
  - Niederstift, the northerly part, in ecclesiastical respect part of the diocese of Osnabrück
- Prince-Bishopric of Utrecht (Sticht Utrecht):
  - Oversticht, the northerly territorially separate part
  - Nedersticht, the southerly part with Utrecht

== In compound nouns ==
As a component the term Stift today usually takes the copulative "s" when used as a preceding compound. Composite terms frequently found are such as Stiftsadel ('vassal nobility of a prince-bishopric'), Stiftsamtmann ('official of a Stift'), Stiftsbibliothek ('library [originally] financed with the funds of a collegiate Stift'), Stiftsdame ('conventual in a Lutheran women's endowment'), Stiftsfehde ('feud with a prince-bishopric involved'), Stiftsfrau ('collegiate canoness'), Stiftsfräulein ('conventual in a Lutheran women's endowment'), Stiftsgymnasium ('high school [originally] financed with the funds of a collegiate Stift'), Stiftsherr ('collegiate canon'), Stiftsmann (plural: Stiftsleute 'vassal tenant of an estate of a Stift'), Stiftssasse ('subject/inhabitant of a prince-bishopric'), Stiftsstände ('estates of a prince-bishopric as a realm'), or Stiftstag ('diet of the estates of a prince-bishopric').
