= Westerhof =

Westerhof is a Dutch toponymic surname, meaning "western homestead/farm". The surname originates from a number of farms. Notable people with the surname include:

- Ailke Westerhof (1876–1946), Dutch Red Cross nurse during World War I
- Angelique Westerhof (born 1969), Dutch fashionista
- Boy Westerhof (born 1985), Dutch tennis player
- Clemens Westerhof (born 1940), Dutch football manager
- Hans Westerhof (born 1948), Dutch football manager
- Lisa Westerhof (born 1981), Dutch sailor
- Marieke Westerhof (born 1974), Dutch rower

== See also ==
- Westerhoff, surname
- Westerhof syndrome, cutaneous condition named after Dutch dermatologist Wiete Westerhof (born 1944)
- Westerhof–Beemer–Cormane syndrome, another such condition
