= SSD Cynthialbalonga =

Italian football club

Albalonga
- Full name: Società Sportiva Dilettantistica Cynthialbalonga
- Founded: 1960; 66 years ago
- Ground: Stadio Pio XII, Albano Laziale, Italy
- Capacity: 1,500
- Chairman: Bruno Camerini
- Manager: Luca Tiozzo
- League: Serie D/G
- 2020–21: 4th, Girone F
Home colours	Away colours

Società Sportiva Dilettantistica Cynthialbalonga is an Italian association football club based in the Latium cities of Genzano di Roma, Albano Laziale, Castel Gandolfo and Pavona, currently playing in Serie D.

== History ==
=== The foundation ===
The club was originally based solely in Albano Laziale and founded as Albano Laziale in 1960, and successively renamed to Albalonga in 1998 following a merger with Pavona Castel Gandolfo, a club that was itself born from a merger of two other clubs in the cities of Pavona and Castel Gandolfo.

In their first season, S.S.D. Cynthialbalonga played in the Promozione league, the sixth tier of Italian football. They won the league in their first attempt, earning promotion to Eccellenza, the fifth tier.

In their first season in Eccellenza, S.S.D. Cynthialbalonga finished second in their group, qualifying for the promotion playoffs. They were eliminated in the first round, but were awarded a place in Serie D due to the restructuring of Italian football.

In their first season in Serie D, S.S.D. Cynthialbalonga finished in 12th place in their group, avoiding relegation to Eccellenza. In the following season, they improved to 7th place in their group.

In the 2019–20 season, S.S.D. Cynthialbalonga finished in 5th place in their group, narrowly missing out on a place in the promotion playoffs. The season was cut short due to the COVID-19 pandemic, and no promotions or relegations were awarded.

In 2020 they changed their name to Cynthialbalonga following another merger, this time with historical club Cynthia from Genzano di Roma.

== Colors and badge ==
Its colors are all-light blue.
