= Gandulf =

Gandulf or Gandolf (Latin Gandolphus, French Gandolphe, Italian Gandolfo) is a masculine given name of Germanic origin, common in the Middle Ages. The roots of the name are gand (literally "wand" or "magic wand", by extension "sorcery") and wolf ("wolf").

- Gandulf of Piacenza (10th century), Italian count
- Gandulf (11th century), bishop of Reggio nell'Emilia
- Gandulf (died 1184), bishop of Alba
- Gandulf of Bologna (died after 1185), theologian
- Gandulf (died 1229), abbot of Saint-Sixte and cardinal
- Gandulf of Binasco (died 1260), Franciscan saint
- Gandolphus Siculus (floruit 1438–44), Sicilian papal legate to India

== See also ==
- Gandalf (disambiguation)
- Gandolfi
- Gandolfini
- Gundulf
- Castel Gandolfo
