= La Cecchina =

La Cecchina may refer to:

- La buona figliuola, or La Cecchina, a 1760 opera buffa by Niccolò Piccinni
- Francesca Caccini (1587 – c. 1641), Italian singer and composer, nicknamed La Cecchina

== See also ==
- Cecchina, a hamlet in Lazio, Italy
