= Gandolfi =

Gandolfi is an Italian surname, from a Lombardic given name Gundulf.

== People named Gandolfi ==
- Ubaldo Gandolfi (1728–1781), an Italian painter
- Gaetano Gandolfi (1734–1802), an Italian painter
- Mauro Gandolfi (1764–1834), an Italian painter and printmaker
- Democrito Gandolfi (1797–1874), an Italian sculptor
- Louis Gandolfi (1864-1932), founder of the Gandolfi Field camera company
- Sauveur Gandolfi-Scheit (born 1947), a member of the National Assembly of France
- Michael Gandolfi (born 1956), an American composer of contemporary classical music
- Javier Gandolfi (born 1980), an Argentine football defender

== In popular culture ==
- Rinaldo Gandolfi, a character in the video game Castlevania: Lament of Innocence

== See also ==
- Gandolf
- Castel Gandolfo
