= Gandolph =

Gandolph may refer to:

- Rommy Gandolph, character in the 2002 Scott Turow novel Reversible Errors
- Gandolph Fitch, recurring character played by Isaac Hayes in The Rockford Files
- Gandolph Ernst Stainhauser (1766–1805), artist whose drawing of Ludwig van Beethoven was engraved by Johann Joseph Neidl

== See also ==
- Max Gandolph von Kuenburg (1622–1687), Prince-Archbishop of Salzburg Maximilian
- Gandalf (disambiguation)
- Gandulf, a given name
