= Gandalf (disambiguation) =

Gandalf is a fictional wizard in J. R. R. Tolkien's book The Lord of the Rings.

Gandalf may also refer to:

== In business and technology ==
- Gandalf Airlines, an airline company
- Gandalf Technologies, a modem and PACX manufacturer
- Gandalf, a chess engine, named after the Tolkien character

== In music ==
- Gandalf (Finnish band), an early 1990s death metal band
- Gandalf (musician), Austrian New Age musician
- Gandalf (American band), formerly Rahgoos, an influential late 1960s psychedelic rock group

== In Norse mythology and folklore ==
- Gandalf (mythology), a dwarf in Norse mythology
- Gandalf Alfgeirsson, the legendary king of Vingulmark

== In popular culture ==
- Gandalf the Mad, a Viking king in the Thorgal comic series
- Gandalf, used to describe lead character Saito, a character in the anime The Familiar of Zero

== Other ==
- Gandalf's Garden,
- GANDALF trial, the 1997 UK trial of the editors of Green Anarchist magazine

== See also ==
- Gundulf
- Gandolph (disambiguation)
