= Gundulf =

Gundulf and its variants (Gondulf, Gundulph, Kundolf, Gondulphus, Gundulfus, Gundolfo, Gondon) is a Germanic given name, from gund, "battle", and wulf, "wolf".

It may refer to:

- Gondulf of Provence, 6th-century duke and possibly made Bishop of Metz in 591
- Indulf (6th century) (fl. 549–552 or 553), also known as Gundulf, Byzantine mercenary and Ostrogoth army leader
- Gondulphus of Berry, 7th-century bishop
- Gondulph of Maastricht (died after 614), bishop and Roman Catholic and Eastern Orthodox saint
- Gondulphus of Metz (died 823), Bishop of Metz
- Gundolfo, early 11th century Italian heretic
- Gundulf of Rochester (died 1108), English bishop

== See also ==
- Gandulf
- Castel Gandolfo
