= Gandolfini =

Gandolfini is an Italian surname. Notable people with the surname include:

- James Gandolfini (1961–2013), American actor
- Michael Gandolfini (born 1999), American actor

== See also ==
- Gandolfino d'Asti, Italian Renaissance painter
