= Pavona =

- Frazione
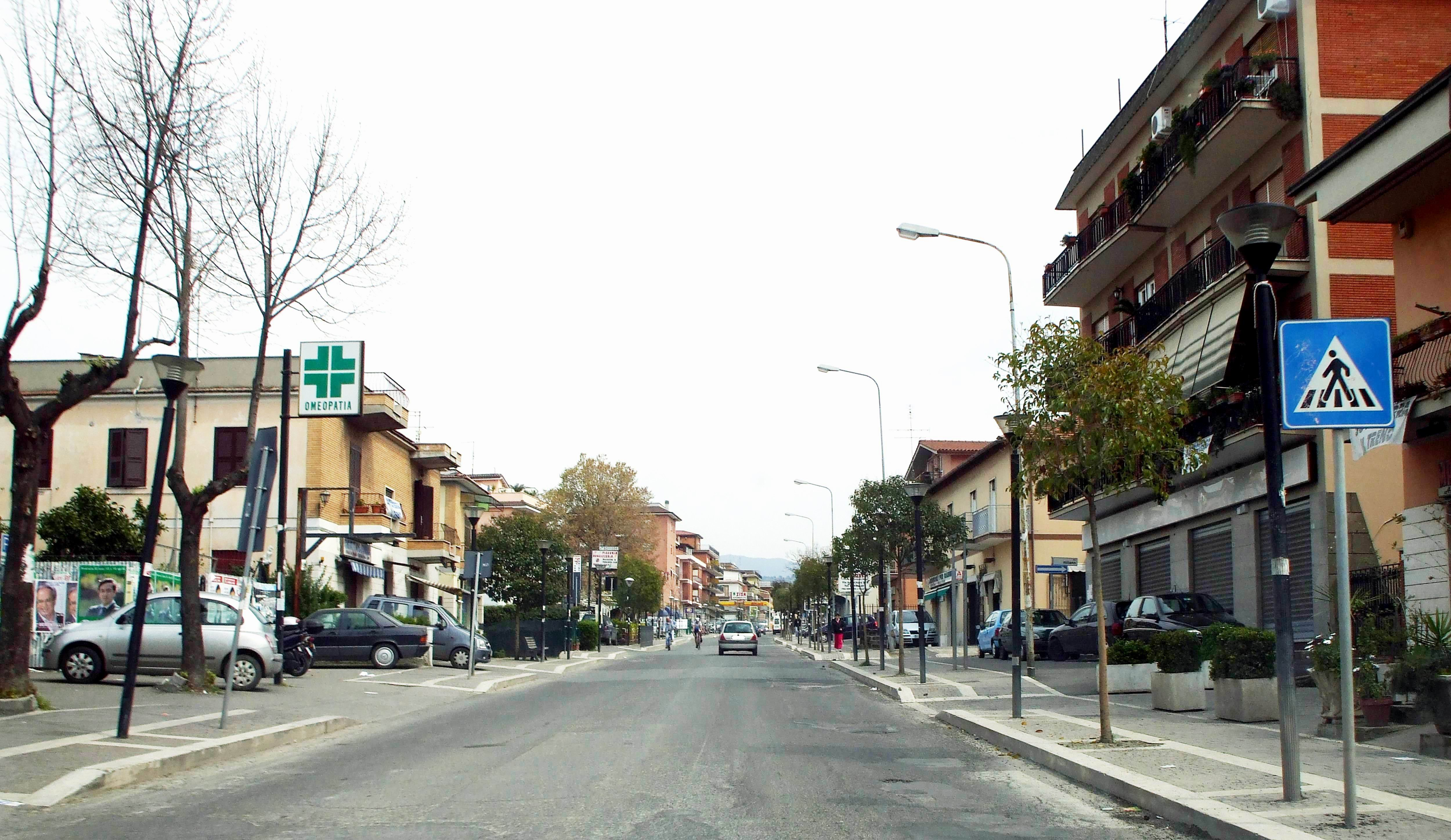
- A view in Pavona. The left side of the road belongs to Castel Gandolfo, the right one to Albano Laziale

- Location of Pavona in Italy
- Coordinates: 41°43′N 12°37′E
- Country: Italy
- Region: Lazio
- Province: Rome
- Comune: Albano Laziale; Castel Gandolfo; Rome
- Elevation: 150 m (490 ft)

Population (2004)
  - Total: 13,100
- Demonym: Pavonensi
- Time zone: UTC+1 (CET)
  - Summer (DST): UTC+2 (CEST)
- Postal code: 00040 / 00041
- Dialing code: 06

Pavona is a hamlet in Lazio, central Italy. It is a frazione of the comune (municipality) of Albano Laziale. However, its traditional territory is also included in those of Castel Gandolfo and Rome.

== Overview ==
The Albano fraction includes some 7,600 inhabitants, the other two amounting to c. 3,500 and 2,000, respectively.

The patron saint of Pavona is Saint Joseph, celebrated on May 1.

== See also ==
- Cecchina
