= Castel Gandolfo =

- Comune
- Città di Castel Gandolfo
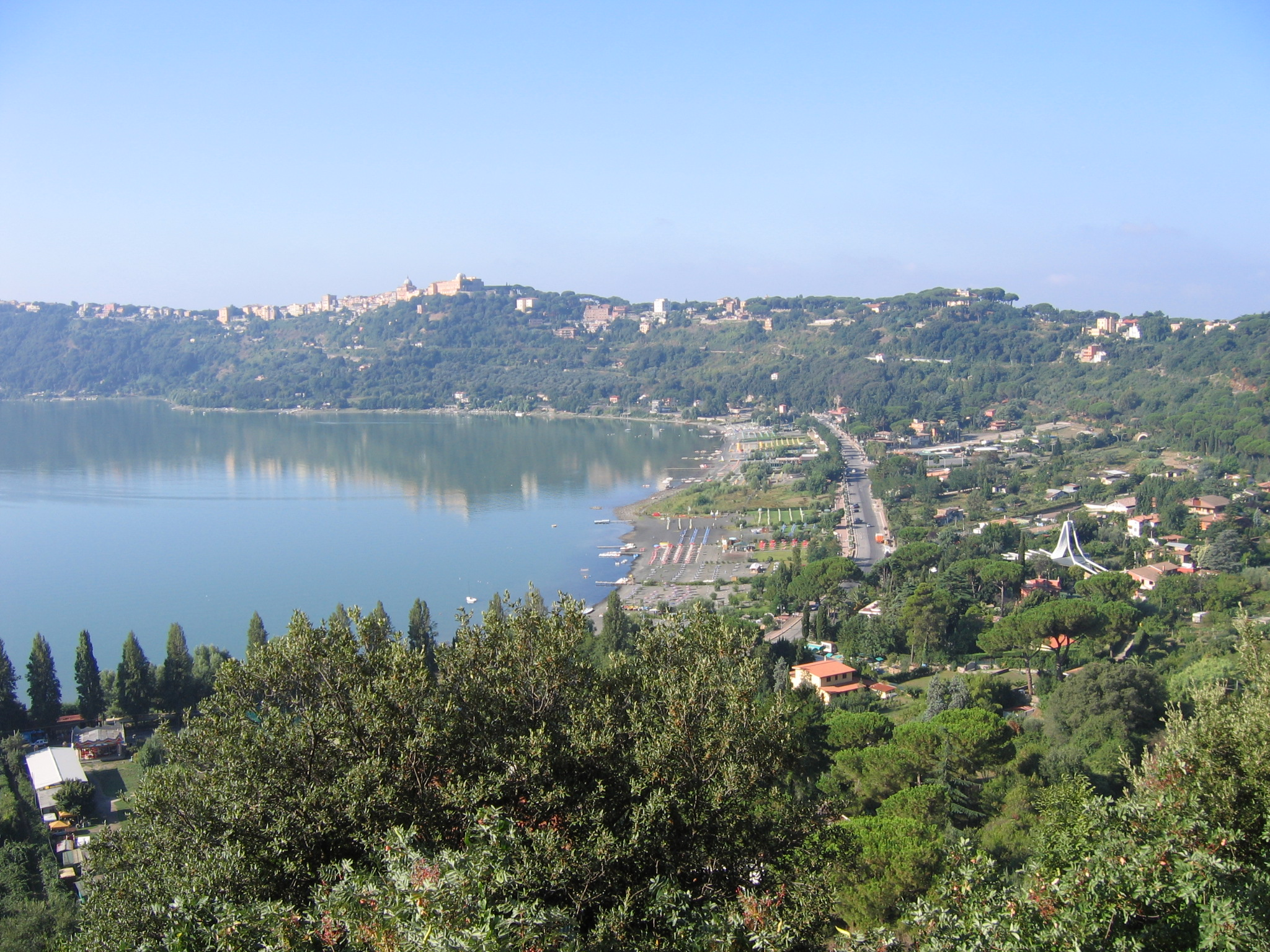
- The town of Castel Gandolfo overlooking Lake Albano

- Location within Italy Location within Lazio
- Coordinates: 41°44′49″N 12°39′07″E
- Country: Italy
- Region: Lazio
- Metropolitan city: Rome
- Frazioni: Mole di Castel Gandolfo, Pavona

Government
  - Mayor: Milvia Monachesi

Area
  - Total: 14.19 km^{2} (5.48 sq mi)
- Elevation: 426 m (1,398 ft)

Population (31 May 2017)
  - Total: 8,940
  - Density: 630/km^{2} (1,630/sq mi)
- Demonym: Castellani
- Time zone: UTC+1 (CET)
  - Summer (DST): UTC+2 (CEST)
- Postal code: 00040
- Dialing code: 06
- Patron saint: St. Sebastian (San Sebastiano)
- Saint day: 20 January
- Website: Official website

Castel Gandolfo (UK: /ˌkæstɛl ɡænˈdɒlfoʊ/, US: /kɑːˌstɛl ɡɑːnˈdoʊlfoʊ, -ˈdɔːl-/, Italian: [kaˈstɛl ɡanˈdɔlfo]; Latin: Castrum Gandulphi), colloquially known as Castello in the Castelli Romani dialects, is a small town located 25 km (16 mi) southeast of Rome, in the Italian region of Lazio. Situated on a hilltop in the Alban Hills with panoramic views of Lake Albano, Castel Gandolfo is home to approximately 8,900 residents and is renowned as one of Italy's most scenic towns. It is one of I Borghi più belli d'Italia ("The most beautiful villages of Italy").

Within the town's boundaries lies the Apostolic Palace of Castel Gandolfo, which has served as the summer residence and vacation retreat for most popes since 1626. Although the palace is located within the boundaries of Castel Gandolfo, it holds an extraterritorial status as one of the properties of the Holy See and is not under Italian jurisdiction. It has been transformed into a museum and is now open to the public. Notwithstanding the main Apostolic Palace's current status as a museum, the Castel Gandolfo complex resumed its traditional status as the pope's summer residence and vacation retreat in July 2025.

The resort community encompasses almost the entire coastline of Lake Albano, which is surrounded by numerous summer residences, villas, and cottages that were constructed during the 17th century. It is also home to the Stadio Olimpico, which hosted the rowing events of the 1960 Rome Summer Olympics.

Castel Gandolfo has several places of archaeological interest, including the Emissario del Lago Albano and the remains of the Villa of Domitian. The area is included within the boundaries of the Parco Regionale dei Castelli Romani (Regional Park of Castelli Romani). There are also many points of artistic interest, such as the Collegiate Church of St. Thomas of Villanova, designed by Gian Lorenzo Bernini.

== Geography ==
=== Territory ===
The boundaries of the town extend obliquely in a north-northeast turn around the hilly area of the Alban Hills and the plains of Agro Romanus. It is included and protected by the Regional Park of Castelli Romani, formed in 1984. Most of the soil is of volcanic origin, with prevalence of materials such as tuff and pozzolana. Its seismic classification is rated a Zone 2 (medium-high seismicity)

==== Hydrography ====
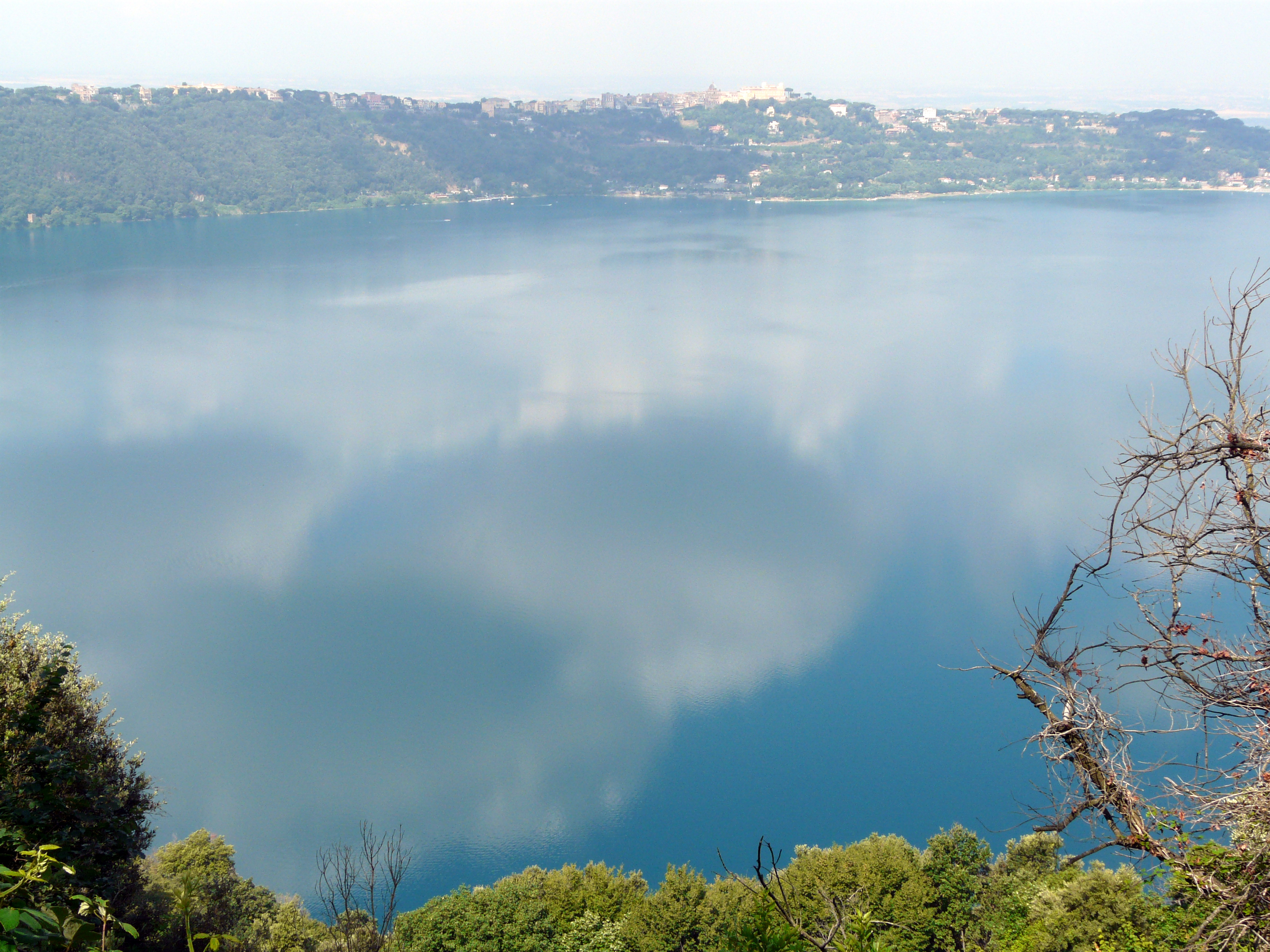
Lake Albano

The main water body is Lake Albano, often called Lake Castel Gandolfo. The Metropolitan City of Rome currently manages the lake. Up to 1802, it was the property of the Abbey of Saint Nilus Grottaferrata, the Apostolic Camera (Roman Catholic Church's Financial Administration) and then owned by Prince Stanislaus Poniatowski in 1870.

==== Topography ====
The maximum elevation registered in the territory is 425 m (1,390 ft) above sea level, at the Collegio di Propaganda Fide adjoining Villa Barberini. On the crown of the hills around the Lake Albano, the elevation is only 400 m (1,300 ft) above sea level, at the summit of Monte Cucco, bordering Marino.

Towards the Tyrrhenian Sea, the land slopes gently, so from 250 m (820 ft) from the Casale Santa Cristina, below Castel Savello bordering Albano, goes to 217 m (712 ft) above sea level at Colle Lilli, to 200 m (660 ft) above sea level at Pozzo di Valle, to 155 m (509 ft) Quarto Santa bordering Marino, to 130 m (430 ft) above sea level of the Laghetto di Turno. The lowest elevation of the territory is 101 m (331 ft) above sea level at the village of Pavona.

=== Climate ===
In terms of climate, the area falls within the domain of the temperate Mediterranean climate with mild winters, autumn temperatures higher than those of spring and ventilated summers. In the area of Colli Albani, and at Castel Gandolfo, the phenomenon known as stau, which is the reduction of water vapor in the clouds as the ground rises can be observed. Summers are hot and dry, while winter is mild and rainy without, in general, extreme low temperatures and snow. In summer, temperatures can reach 35 °C (95 °F) with peaks of 37 °C (99 °F) in rare cases. Climate classification: Zone D, 1966 GR / G.

== Etymology ==
The name "Castel Gandolfo" is derived from the Latin Castrum Gandulphi, the name of the castle on this site was presumably owned by the family of Gandolfi, originally from Genoa. Another hypothesis, supported by Pope Pius II in his commentary (1462), is that the name results from Gandulphi Sabinorum, from a certain Gandolfo Savelli.

== History ==
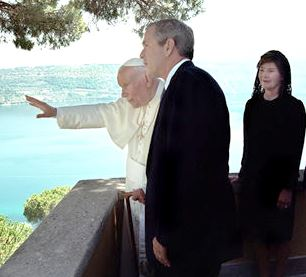
John Paul II at Castel Gandolfo, 23 July 2001, with George W. Bush and Laura Bush

Archaeological finds from the 16th century BC come from the area of what is now Castel Gandolfo.

The site of the modern town is a candidate for the site of legendary ancient Alba Longa, capital of the Latin League. It was later developed by the Emperor Domitian into his vast palace.

Its name is derived from a fortification of the ducal Gandolfi family (of Genoese origin, named after St. Gondolfus) in the 12th century, which passed to the Savelli family from whom the Apostolic Camera purchased it in 1596 for 150,000 scudi. Pope Clement VIII (1592–1605) was the first pope to come to Castel Gandolfo, but the rebuilding of the old castle was the project of Urban VIII, who first made it an official papal residence in 1626.

During the Napoleonic Wars, some 900 anti-French citizens of neighboring Velletri held out in Castel Gandolfo, resisting the siege by Joachim Murat.

During World War II, Pope Pius XII opened up the grounds of Castel Gandolfo to refugees escaping the fighting taking place around Rome. On 22 January 1944, the first of what became 12,000 people began arriving on the property, often bringing with them their cows, horses, mules and sheep. Included were many Roman Jews, and other non-Catholics. During the time they lived there, 36 children were born, almost all of whom were named after the Pope who gave them safe harbor. The pope's private apartment was turned into a nursery.

Pope Benedict (2005–2013) loved it so much he briefly retired there after leaving the papacy. Pope Francis (2013–2025), however, rarely traveled there, with a gap of nearly 12 years with no visits. However, he did open the pontifical palace and gardens to the public for the first time, increasing tourism to the town. His successor Pope Leo XIV (2025–present) first used it as a summer residence in 2025, and said that he would continue the tradition; 2026 will be the 400-year anniversary as a papal residence. On 6 July 2025, Pope Leo XIV would begin staying at Castel Gandolfo for a six-week vacation, thus resuming the tradition of Castel Gandolfo being used as the pope's retreat and summer home. However, the main Apostolic Palace at Castel Gandolfo still remains a museum, with Leo XIV instead staying at the Castel Gandolfo's Villa Barberini.

== Main sights ==
=== Religious architecture ===
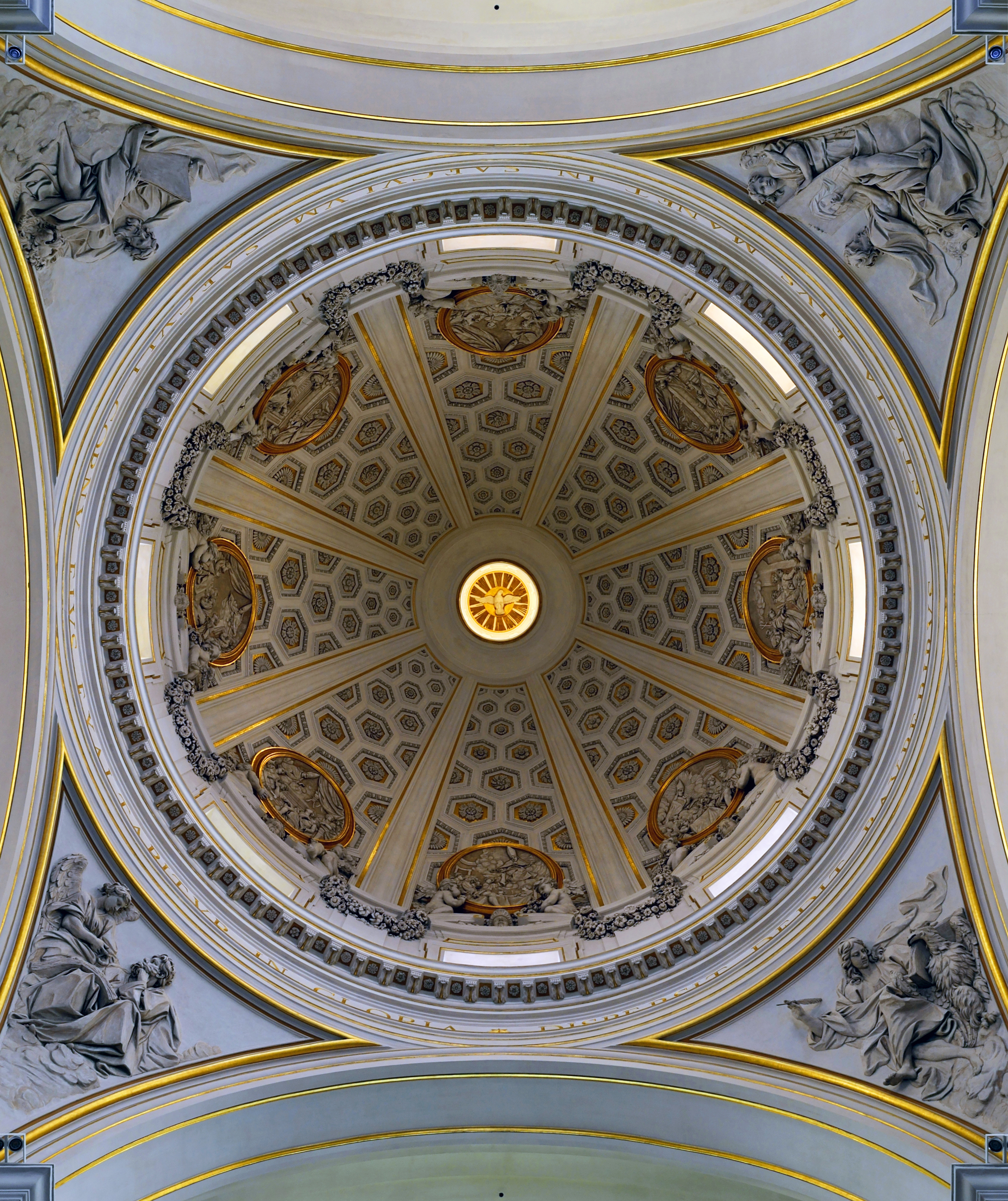
Cupola of Bernini's parish church

- The parish church, dedicated to St. Thomas of Villanova was designed by Bernini (1658–1661) on the order of the Chigi Pope Alexander VII, it has a square Greek key cross plan and houses a notable painting by Pietro da Cortona portraying Christ's crucifixion.
- Church of Our Lady of the Lake, wanted personally by Pope Paul VI, was consecrated by the same pope in 1977, on the shores of Lake Albano.
- Church of Santa Maria Assunta, construction began in 1619 with the consecration of the first stone by Pope Paul V.
- Church of Santa Maria, modern construction, situated in the populous district of Borgo San Paolo near State Road 7 Via Appia, the Ugo Bazzi theater adjoins the church.
- Church of San Sebastiano, dedicated to the patron saint of the city and located on State Road 7 Via Appia adjacent to the church cemetery.
- Church of Santa Maria Della Cona.

=== Civil architecture ===
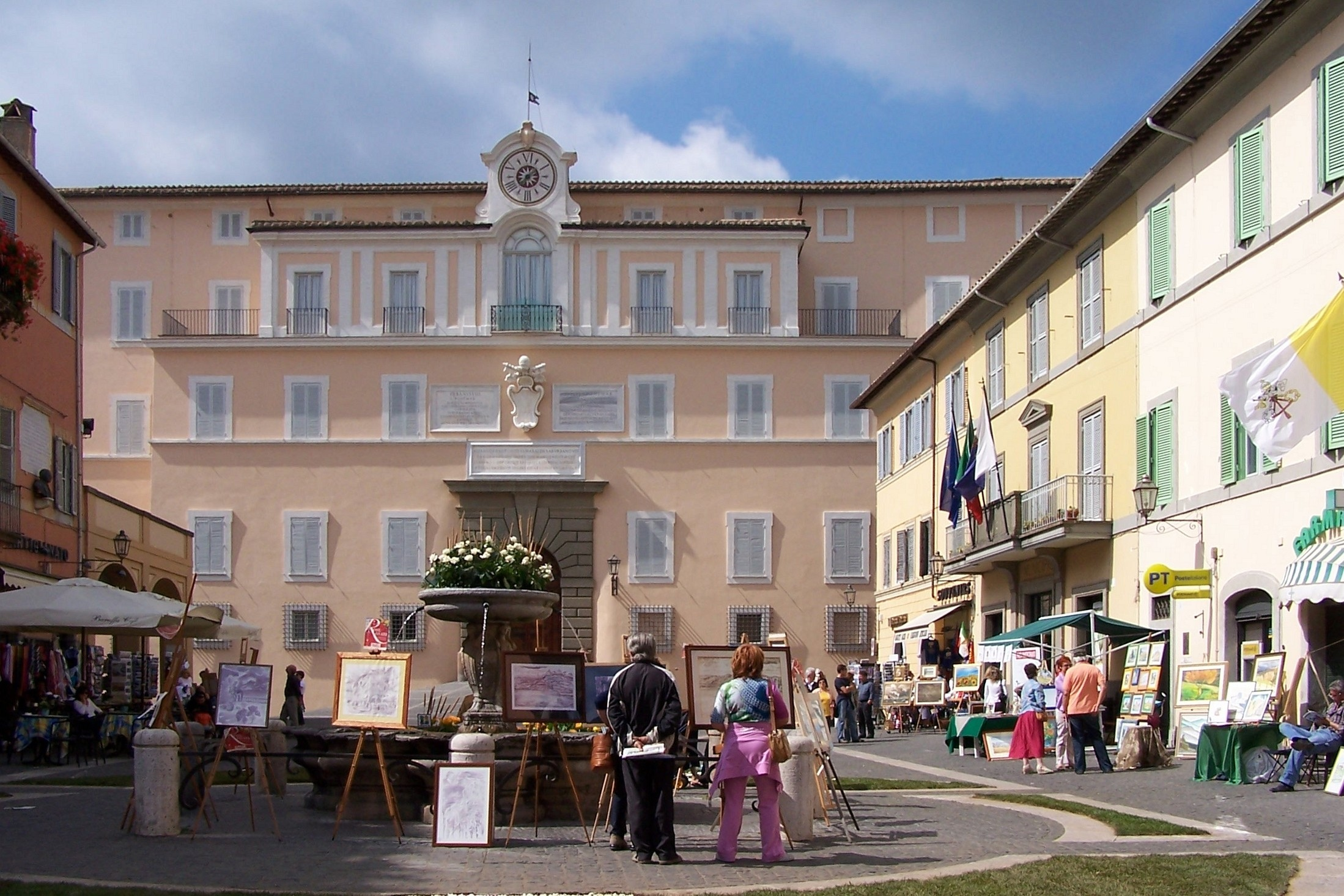
The façade of the Papal Palace

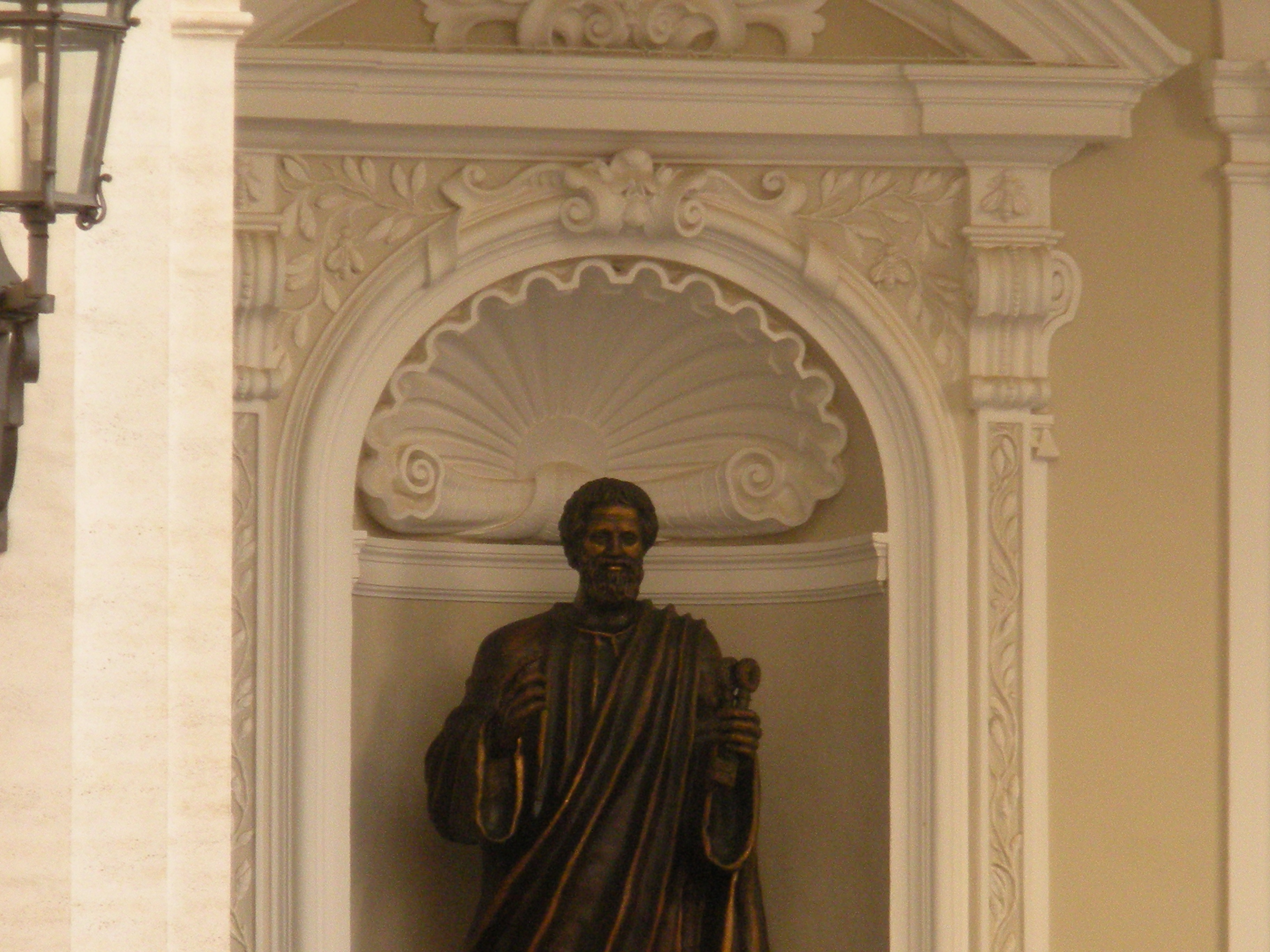
Statue of St. Peter

- The Apostolic Palace of Castel Gandolfo, the pope's summer residence, is a 17th-century building designed by Carlo Maderno for Pope Urban VIII. The papal palace and the adjoining Villa Barberini, which was added to the complex by Pius XI, have enjoyed extraterritorial rights since the signing of the 1929 treaty with Italy; the little piazza directly in front was renamed Piazza della Libertà in the first flush of Italian unity after 1870. The Papal Palace remained unused from 1870 until 1929.
- Villa Cybo, built by Cardinal Camillo Cybo, was annexed to the whole of the Pontifical Villas at the time of Pope Clement XIV who purchased it in 1774 from the owner at the time, Francesco III d'Este, Duke of Modena, for the sum of 80,000 crowns.
- Villa Barberini, built by the nephew of Pope Urban VIII (Maffeo Barberini), was incorporated in the extraterritorial complex of the Pontifical Villas in 1929: the manor houses the headquarters of the College of Propaganda Fide. As part of its extensive formal gardens is located the existing remains of the complex built by the Roman Emperor Domitian.
- Villa Santa Caterina, currently used by the Catholic Institute of Technology. During the construction of this villa, situated in the Herculaneum area, the Roman ruins of the villa commonly attributed to Publius Clodius Pulcher were discovered.
- Villa Torlonia, built in the 16th century by the Roman family of the Giustiniani, then passed into ownership of the Duke of Bracciano Giuseppe Torlonia. The current appearance is due to the restoration of 1829, funded by Duke Carlo Torlonia.
- Villa Chigi built by Cardinal Flavio Chigi, nephew of Pope Alexander VII; today it is home to a golf course.
- The two telescopes of the Vatican Observatory, which were moved from Rome to Castel Gandolfo in the 1930s, were still used until the 1980s. The headquarters of the Vatican Observatory is still located in Castel Gandolfo. However, its dependent research center, the Vatican Observatory Research Group (VORG), is hosted by Steward Observatory at the University of Arizona, Tucson, United States. The telescopes are located in Mt. Graham, Arizona.

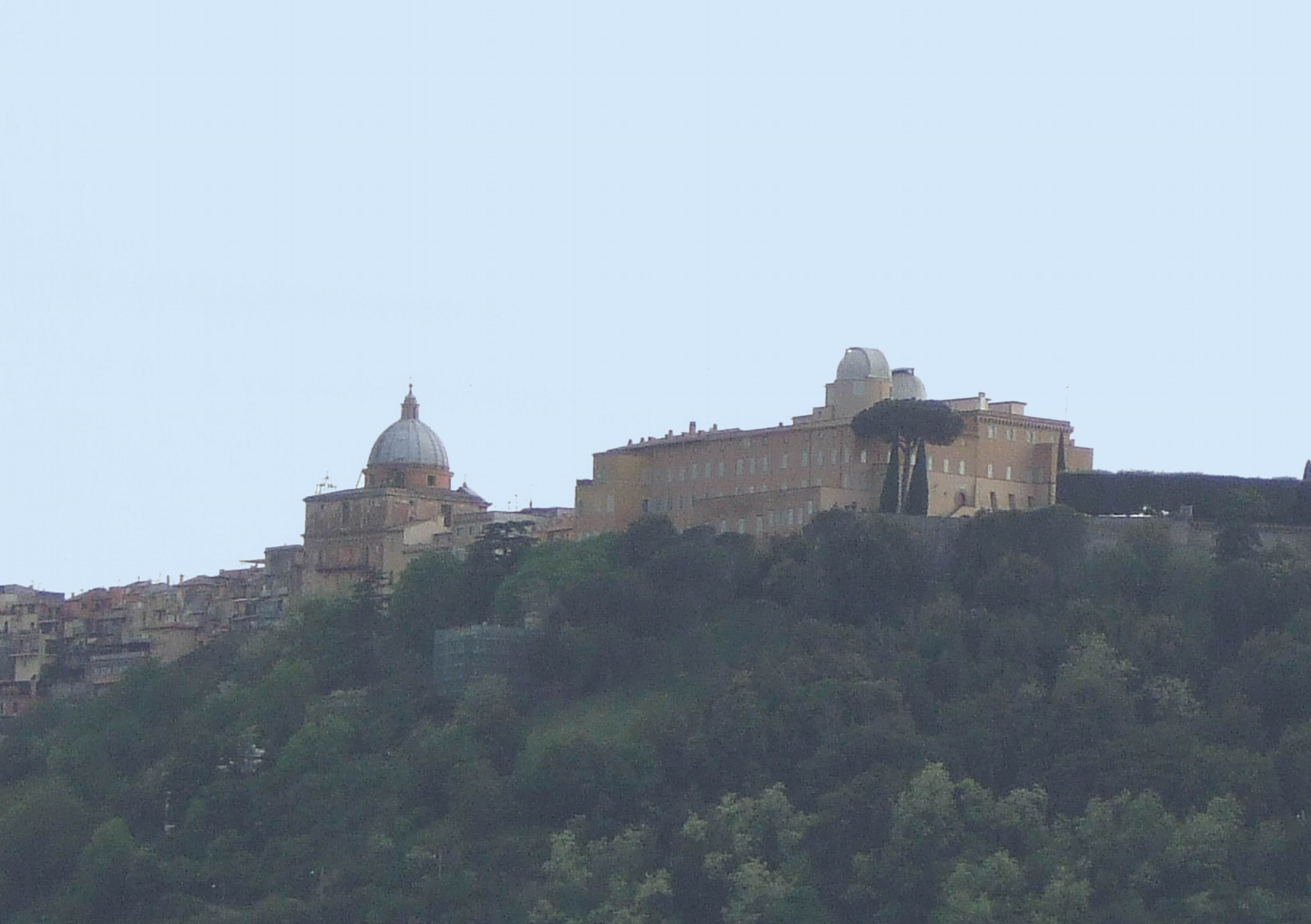
The Pontifical Palace of Castel Gandolfo with the dome of the Collegiate Church of St. Thomas and that of the Vatican Observatory

=== Archaeological sites ===
- The site of the papal palace: rebuilt on the ruins of the former castle, partly occupies the foundations of a summer residence of the Emperor Domitian that occupied 14 square kilometres (5.4 sq mi). The residence was designed by the architect Rabirius. In the palace's inner courtyard is a Roman bust depicting Polyphemus, the Cyclops from whose cave Ulysses escaped; it was found in the nymphaeum of the Imperial villa's gardens, an artificially constructed grotto of the crater lake's outlet.
- Supposed Villa of Publius Clodius Pulcher: the remains of a Roman villa located on the Appian Way, 23 kilometres (14 mi) of National Road 7 Via Appia, inside the Villa Santa Caterina, used by the Catholic Institute of Technology. After recent studies and excavations, the site is now believed to have been an ancient shrine to the goddess Bona Dea.
- The Bergantino or bath of Diana nymphaeum: on the western shores of the Lake Albano, 2 kilometres (1.2 mi) after the Doric nymphaeum, this structure, originally annexed to the Domitian Villa at Castel Gandolfo, opens in a circular cave of 17 metres (56 ft) in diameter. There is a bath in the middle of the cave, and the floor was completely covered with mosaics, of which a few fragments remain. Various parts of sculptural groups now kept at the Pontifical Palace in Castel Gandolfo have been found in the nymphaeum.
- Emissary of the Lake Albano: an artificial conduit of runoff water, 1,800 metres (5,900 ft) long, that runs from the West coast of Lake Albano and leads into Castel Gandolfo territory. According to tradition, it was built in 396 BC to fulfil a prophecy during the conquest of Veii.

== Education ==
There are no secondary schools in Castel Gandolfo but within the municipal boundaries there is a private kindergarten run by the Paul VI Pontifical Municipal School, at primary and secondary level. The Scuola Media Statale "Dante Alighieri" and other religious institutions provide primary education.

The Catholic Institute of Technology, which opened in 2024, aspires to be an R1 research university, building on a long-standing tradition of major Roman Catholic scientists and engineers. CatholicTech offers bachelors’ degrees in various science and engineering disciplines.

Walsh University, which has its main campus in North Canton, Ohio, United States, has a small campus in Castel Gandolfo. Classes are held in the fall, spring and summer for Walsh students.

== Events ==
- The feast of the patron saint, St. Sebastian (San Sebastiano), is celebrated on the first weekend of September, though the feast of this saint is marked on the calendar on 20 January; the festival concludes with fireworks over the lake.
- The village celebrates St. Paul and St. Mary Ausiliatrice on the last Sunday of May.
- The local market takes place on Friday mornings.
- Festival of Peaches, held on the last Sunday of July with organized cultural, entertainment, and sporting events.
- March for Peace, established by Municipal Statute in the month of January of each year.
- Premio "Città di Castel Gandolfo", a prize to personalities, bodies, and associations that bring the city prestige and better quality of life or have distinguished themselves in any branch of culture, sport or human knowledge.
- Castel Gandolfo Fotografia, photography competition established in 2007.

== Frazioni ==
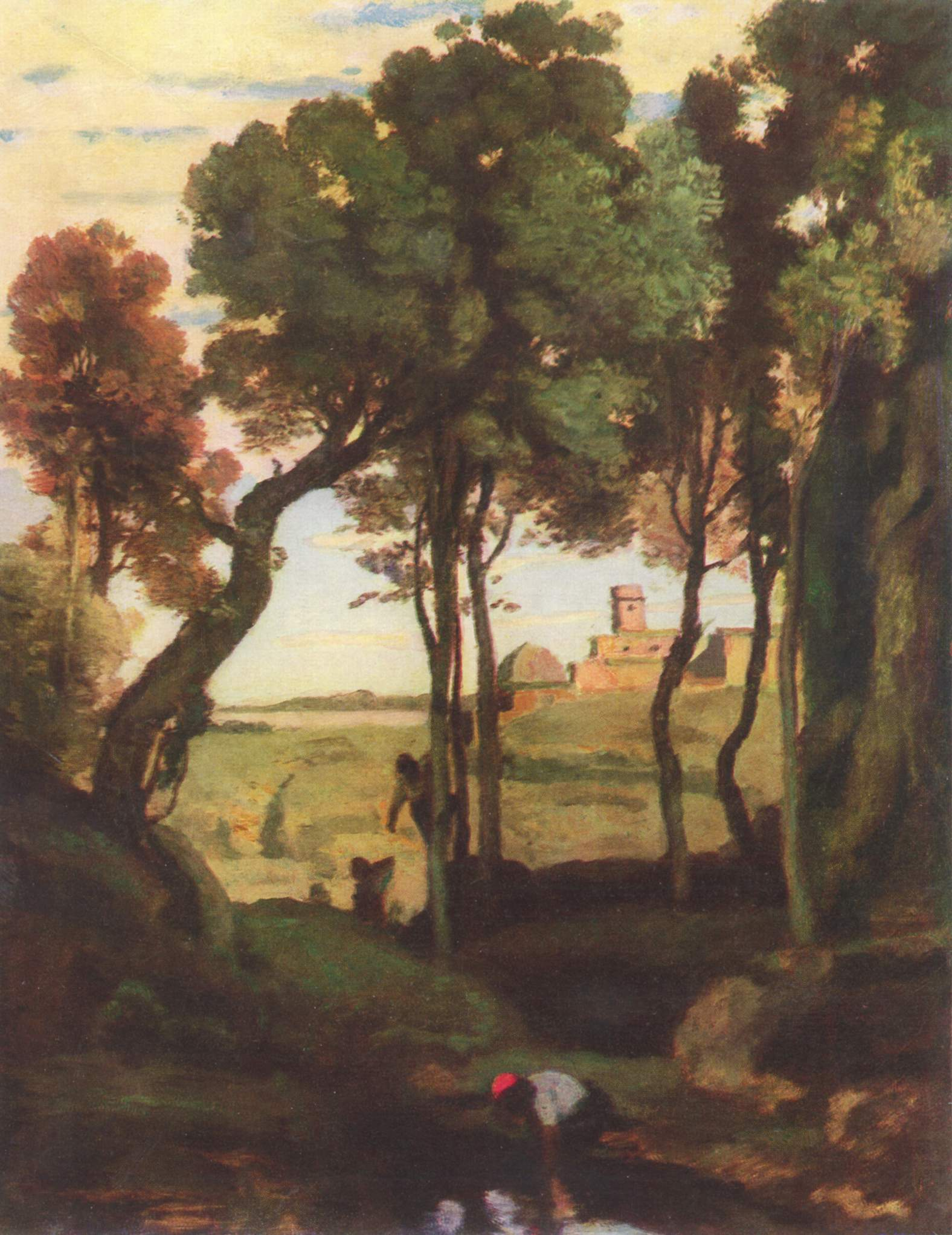
Castel Gandolfo by Jean-Baptiste-Camille Corot (1826)

Pavona was centered around a tavern on the way to Nettuno and the villa of Cardinal Flavio Chigi (1631–1693), nephew of Pope Alexander VII. The place was urbanized during the 20th century, thanks to the opening of the railway Roma-Velletri, and today is divided between the municipalities of Castel Gandolfo, Albano Laziale and Rome. The part castle, known as Pavona Pond due to the above-named for Round Pond, has about 3,000 inhabitants and has as its patron saint St. Eugene III of Toledo.

Mole di Castel Gandolfo, divided in part by the town of Albano Laziale, owes their name to the presence in the place of ancient mass fed by the waters of the Emissary of Lake Albano, which were used until the 19th century by the inhabitants of Castel Gandolfo and Albano Laziale to crush the grain.

== Economy ==
In all the municipalities in the Alban Hills, agriculture, and particularly wine production, has always been the main economic voice and employer. Wines include the Frascati, the Marino, the Velletri and the Colli Lanuvini.

The production of wine is maintained by major producers such as Cantina Sociale Gotto d'Oro of Marino and Frascati, which is based in the nearby town of Castelluccia, and the Wine Cellar Social Albano Laziale and Ariccia, based in Fontana di Papa.

== Services ==
Municipal Statute prohibits installation of equipment and systems, fixed telecommunication and radio devices, particularly equipment for radio, television and mobile telephony, and systems for radio amateurs. This prohibition is exempt for military installations, civil protection and forest protection.

Most services such as hospitals or cinemas are based outside the city in larger centers like Marino, Frascati, Albano Laziale and Genzano di Roma. However, these centres are all reached by car or public transport. In return, the city is commercially very lively, thanks to the continuous influx of Italian tourists and foreigners linked to the presence of the Papal Palace and, at certain times, of the Pope.

=== Transport ===
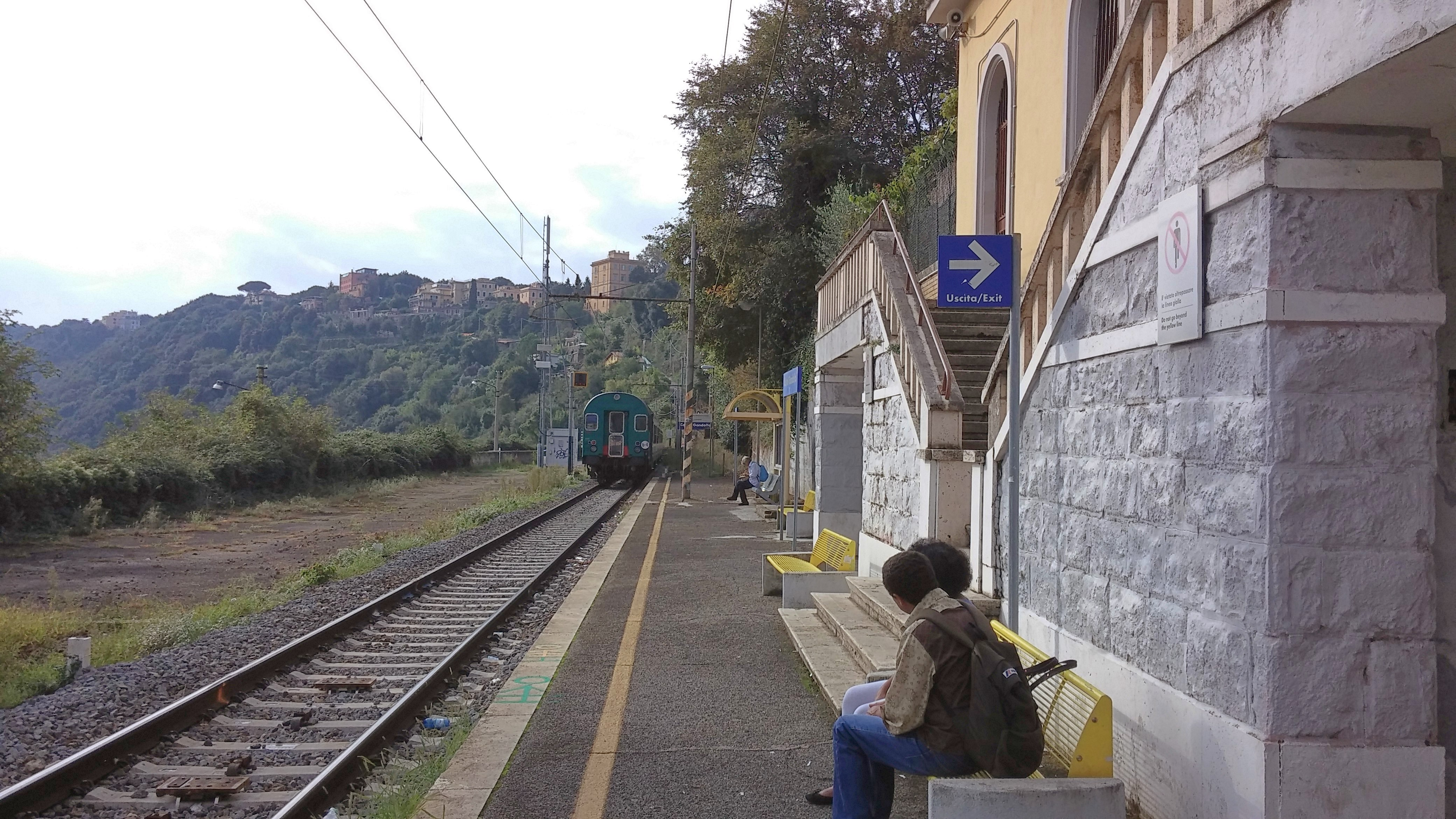
Castel Gandolfo station

The territory of Albano is crossed by two railway lines, belonging to the FL4 of the FL lines.
Lazio regional railways:

- Rome-Albano railway; built starting from 1881 by decree of Umberto I of Savoy, was inaugurated in 1889, until 1927 it continued towards Cecchina and Nettuno. Totally 28.41 kilometers long, it crosses the municipality of Castel Gandolfo serving it with the Villetta station, partially falling within the territory of Albano Laziale, and with the Castel Gandolfo station; it ensures a connection with Rome and with the municipalities of Ciampino, Marino and Albano Laziale.
- Rome-Velletri Railway; inaugurated by Pope Pius IX in 1863, it was the third railway line of the Papal State, and until 1892 it continued towards Valmontone and Naples. Totally 41.01 kilometers long, it crosses the municipality of Castel Gandolfo serving it with the Pavona stations, actually included in the municipality of Albano Laziale; ensures a connection with Rome and with the municipalities of Ciampino, Marino, Albano Laziale, Ariccia, Genzano di Roma, Lanuvio and Velletri.

Castel Gandolfo is also connected by the following roads:

- Strada statale 7 Via Appia;
- Strada statale 140 del Lago Albano;
- Strada statale 207 Nettunense (SS 207);
- Strada provinciale 216 Maremmana III (SP 216);
- Strada regionale 217 Via dei Laghi (SR 217).

Inside the Pontifical Villa there is a heliport used by the Pope for his air travel from the Vatican to Castel Gandolfo.

== Tourism ==
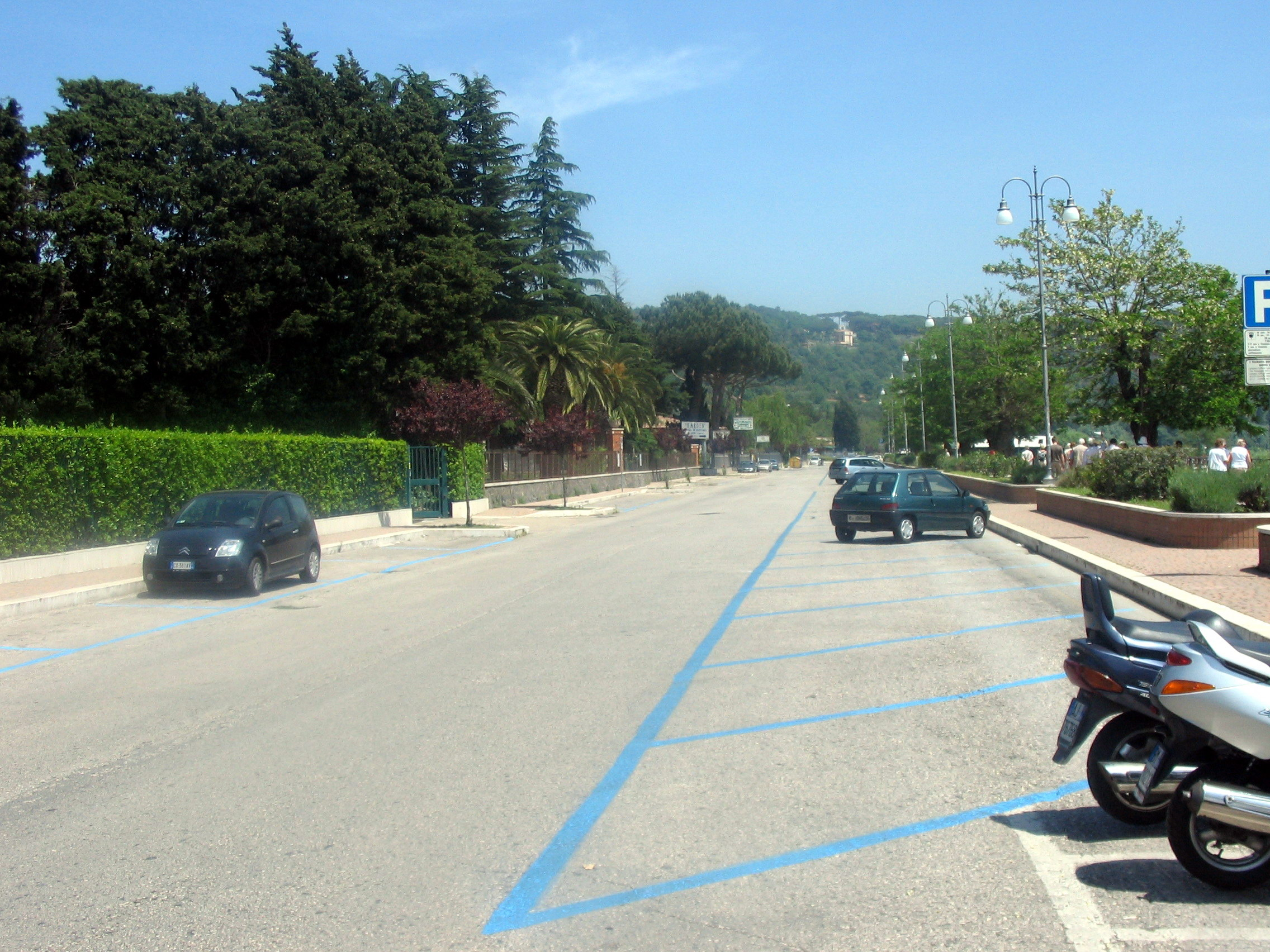
Thoroughfare in Castel Gandolfo

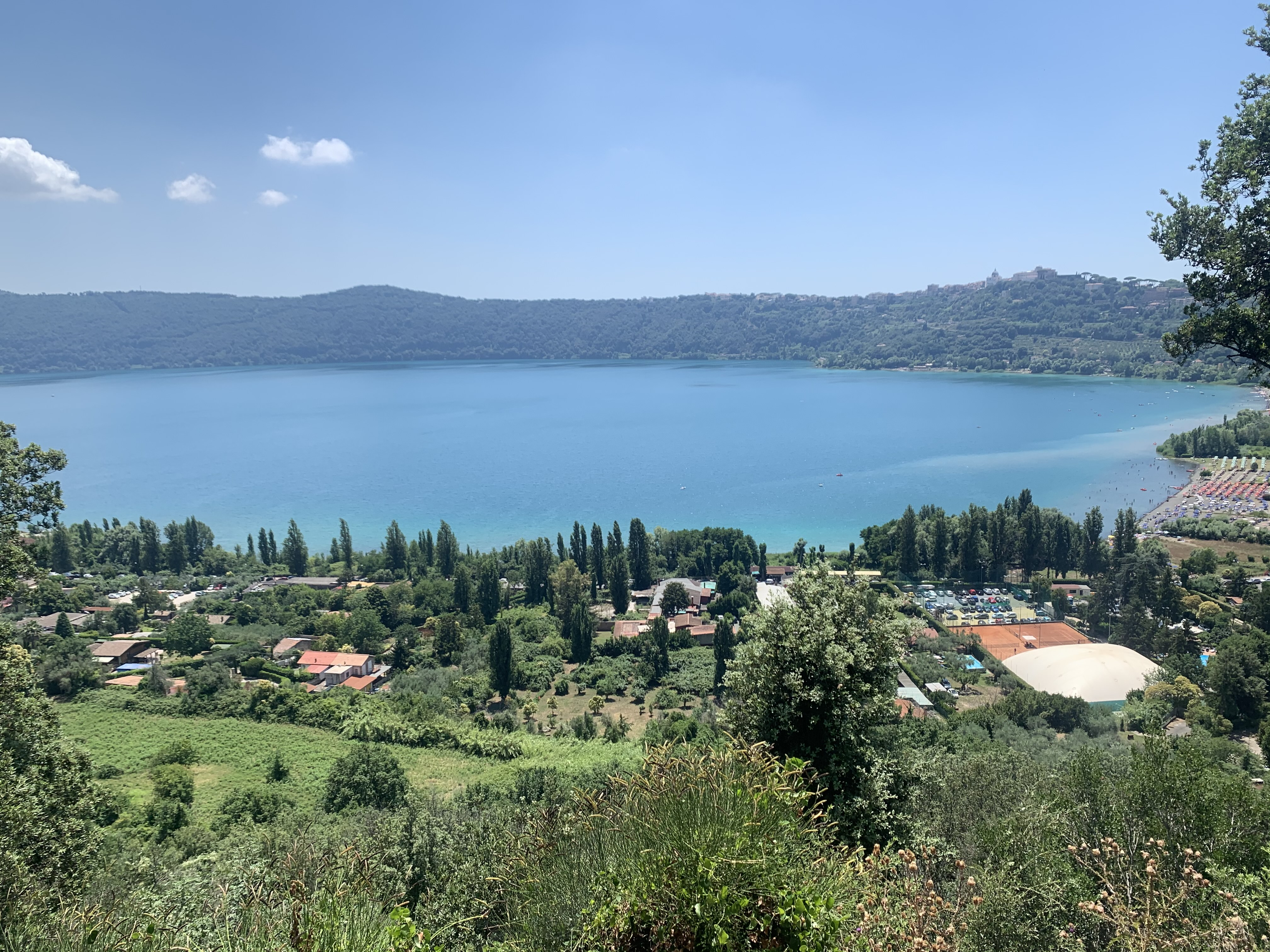
Aquatic facilities on Lake Albano

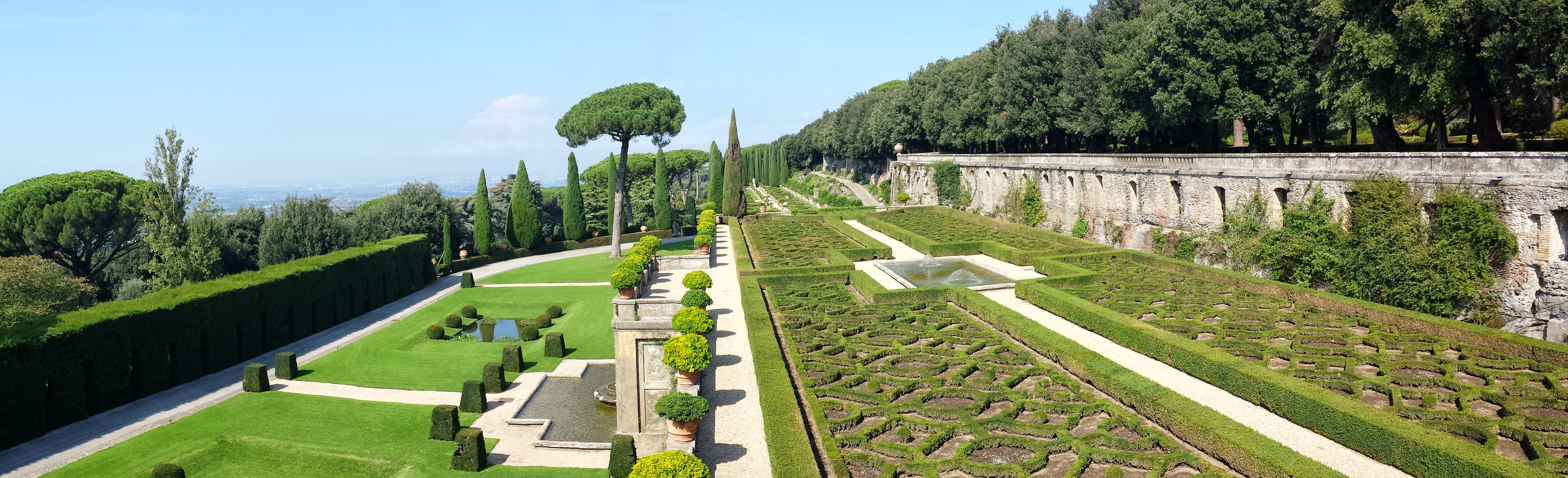
Giardini del Belvedere – Barberini Gardens

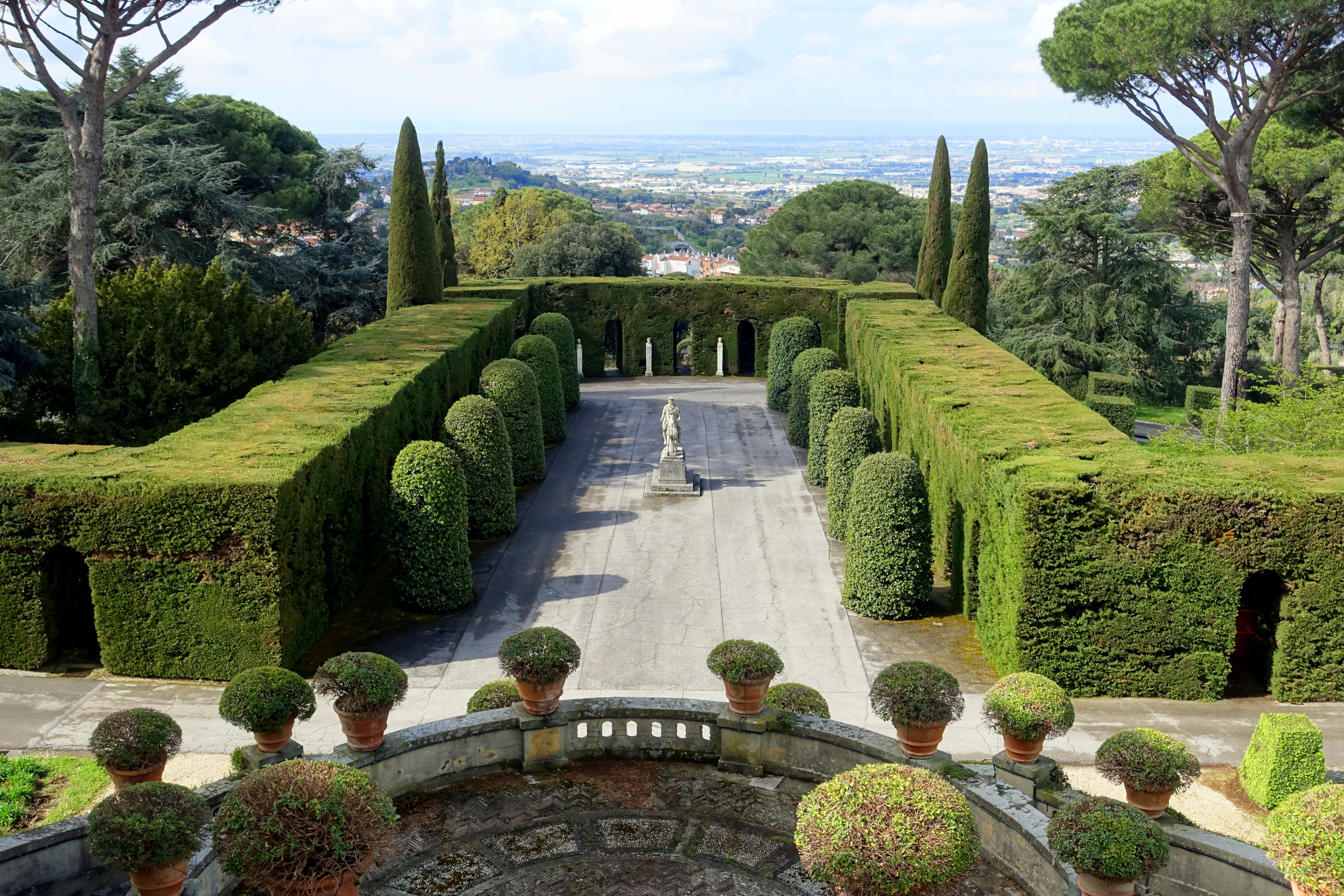
Piazzale Quadrato – Barberini Gardens

Castel Gandolfo is one of the most popular tourist town of the Roman Castles. Regular groups of Italian and foreign tourists use all of the parking built specifically for tourists. On the occasion of Angelus or the hearings on the Pope during his stay, many foreign pilgrims arrive in town, so that the streets and squares in the center are filled. However, Pope Francis gave up his papal residency not long after opening up the doors of the Apostolic Castle to the general public.

== Sports ==
For the 1960 XVII Olympiad held in Rome, the Italian Olympic Committee built the Olympic Stadium and the Federal Center for Canoeing and Kayaking on Lake Albano. At this stage the races were held in this discipline, and even today the Italian Federation of Canoe / Kayak considers this one of its most important training sites.

=== Canoeing/kayaking ===
Since 1960, Lake Albano has been used for Olympic competitions for the sport. Currently, the Master Line Canoeing Sports Association, active since 2005, scored important achievements to promote the sport. Another school of kayaking is held by the ASD Polisportiva Giovanile Salesiana Castel Gandolfo. Prominent clubs currently running kayaking, dragon boat and canoeing activities are ASD Aisa Sport and Circolo Kayak Castel Gandolfo.

=== Football ===
Castel Gandolfo has had an amateur football club since 2005 at Oratory Parish St. Thomas of Villanova which organizes friendly matches with other teams in the area.

=== Golf ===
In the 1970s, Castel Gandolfo Country Club opened in Pavona. The complex is located in the crater of the ancient dried up lake and in the ancient villa of Cardinal Flavio Chigi.

=== Rugby ===
The league includes youth ranging from Under 6 to 16, a senior women's team, a men's and a senior men's team. The latter, formed in 2009, playing in the regional championship of the C series (season 2009/2010).

== Twin towns – sister cities ==
Castel Gandolfo is twinned with the following cities:

- Châteauneuf-du-Pape, France
- Curepipe, Mauritius

== People ==
- Massimo d'Azeglio (1798‒1866), statesman and diarist
- Pietro Savorgnan di Brazzà (1852–1905), explorer

== See also ==
- Alban Hills
- Pavona
