= Gondulphus of Berry =

Saint Gondulphus of Berry (also Gundulfus, Gondulf, Gondon), is a bishop, not to be confused with Gondulf of Maastricht.

He was Archbishop of Milan in the seventh century. Not succeeding in appeasing the troubles which had arisen in his church, he resolved to submit to the inevitable, and retired to Berry with a number of his disciples. It is not known, however, that any Archbishop of Milan had to deal with these conditions. It has been thought that Gondulphus lived at the time of the Milanese schism of the Three Chapters, that he was consecrated in 555, but that he was never received as bishop in his diocese. These are merely hypotheses and in fact it must be said that the history of the St. Gondulphus who is honoured in Berry is unknown.

The attestation of his cult in Berry appears late among the additions to the Martyrology of Usuard; it is cited in the Breviary of Bourges in 1625. He is the patron of St-Gondon, near Gien. His feast is kept on 17 June.
