= Mohammed Ghazy Al-Akhras =

Iraqi Arabic writer and journalist (born 1967)

Mohammed Gahzy Al-Akhras (Arabic:محمد غازي الأخرس; born 17 June 1967) is an Iraqi Arabic writer and journalist. He is known for his moderate political and social opinions, mainly through his daily column in Al Sabaah and his program on the al-Hurra TV channel, Abwab (the Arabic word for "doors"). He has authored several books dealing with the cultural environment in the Arab – particularly the Iraqi – world. The most prominent of his works is Khareef al-Muthaqqaf al-Iraqi (The Fall of Intellect in Iraq). This book was controversial upon publication, and received praise as well as criticism from reviewers.

In 2012, Al-Akhras, a descendant of a Shiite family, launched a campaign to urge Ahmed al-Kubaisy, the notable Iraqi Sunni cleric, to return to his homeland, Iraq, subsequent to rumors of calls in Arab states of the Persian Gulf to deport al-Kubaisy on the grounds of his un-extremist opinions over the unrest in Iraq and the M-E region.
