= Michel-Friedrich Schiefler =

German politician (born 1995)

Member of the Landtag of Mecklenburg-Vorpommern
- Incumbent
- Assumed office 26 October 2021
- Preceded by: Susann Wippermann
- Constituency: Vorpommern-Rügen I

Personal details
- Born: 17 June 1995 (age 30)
- Party: Social Democratic Party (since 2011)

Michel-Friedrich Schiefler (born 17 June 1995) is a German politician serving as a member of the Landtag of Mecklenburg-Vorpommern since 2021. He has served as deputy chairman of the Social Democratic Party in Vorpommern-Rügen since 2019.
