= Gondulph of Maastricht =

6th or 7th-century Frankish bishop of Tongeren-Maastricht

Saint Gondulph
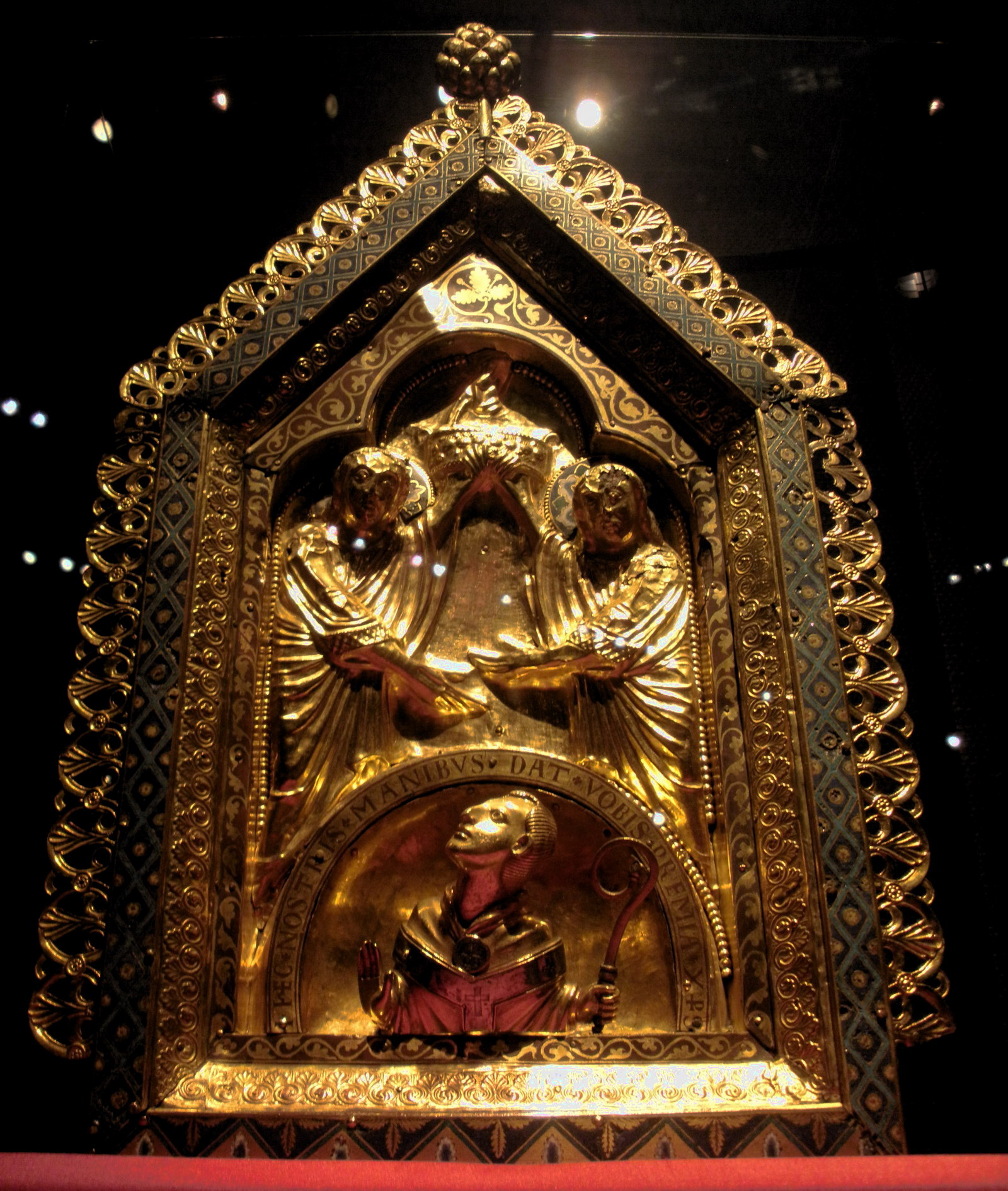
- Saint Gondulph looking up to heaven. The Latin inscription reads: "Hec nostris manibus dat vobis premia Christus (Through our hands Christ gives you these rewards)" (reliquary, Cinquantenaire Museum, Brussels)
- Born: 6th century
- Died: after 614 AD
- Venerated in: Roman Catholic Church; Eastern Orthodox Church
- Feast: 17 June
- Attributes: Often depicted with Monulph, both holding miniature churches

Gondulph (Latin: Gondulfus, Gundulphus, perhaps also Bethulphus) of Maastricht, sometimes of Tongeren (6th/7th century AD) was a bishop of Tongeren-Maastricht venerated as a Roman Catholic and Eastern Orthodox saint. Together with Saint Servatius and Saint Monulph, he is one of the patron saints of the city of Maastricht.

== Legend ==
Very few facts are known about Gondulph of Maastricht. According to a legend, his parents were Munderic and Arthemia. He was married to Palatina, only known child of Maurilion Gallo, a Gallo-Roman aristocrat with likely ties to the Merovingian court. By some reconstructions, the couple had a son named Bodegisel II, who became Duke of Aquitaine. He remains an enigmatic figure. It has been questioned whether he could be identical with Betulph, a bishop of Maastricht mentioned in 614 (see below).

According to tradition, Gondulph was buried in the nave of the church of Saint Servatius in Maastricht, which was built by his predecessor Monulph. In the 11th century, provost Humbert had a cenotaph erected above the alleged grave of the two saints.

== Line of succession ==
According to some 11th century sources Gondulph's predecessor Monulph transferred the episcopal see from Tongeren to Maastricht. However, the official title episcopus Tungrorum (bishop of Tongeren) was retained until the 10th century, although the episcopal see had by that time been transferred from Maastricht to Liège.

Monulph must have occupied the See of Tongeren-Maastricht until the end of the 6th, beginning of the 7th century, because a bishop of Maastricht named Betulph (Betulphus) was present at the Council of Paris in 614. Gondulph then could have been inserted between Monulph and Betulphus, at least if Betulphus is not identified with Gondulph. The case is similar to the situation in the Archbishopric of Mainz, where Bertulfus and Crotoldus seem to be identical. Furthermore, the disputed episcopal lists of the 11th and 12th centuries ignore the historically attested Betulphus and make Gondulph the immediate successor of Monulph. The biographies of Gondulph from the Middle Ages are largely extracts from the Vita Servatii, written by the 11th-century French priest Jocundus more than four centuries after Gondulph's death, and for that reason not reliable.

== Ecclesiastical tradition ==
According to tradition Gondulph occupied the episcopal see of Maastricht for seven years. This last date does not allow for his presence at the Paris Council in 614.

Legend has obscured the historical facts about Gondulph. If Jocundus is to be believed, Gondulph endeavoured to rebuild the town of Tongeren, which had been destroyed during the barbarian invasions. Heavenly intervention caused furious wolves to attack the pagan colonists of the region and devoured them before the eyes of the horrified bishop.

The bodies of Monulph and Gondulph were solemnly exhumed in 1039 by Bishop Nithard of Liège and Gerard of Florennes, Bishop of Cambrai, in the presence of Henry III, Holy Roman Emperor. An epitaph commemorating this event was later misinterpreted, giving rise to a legend according to which the two saints arose from their tomb in 1039 in order to assist at the dedication of Aachen Cathedral.
