= Cecchina =

- Frazione
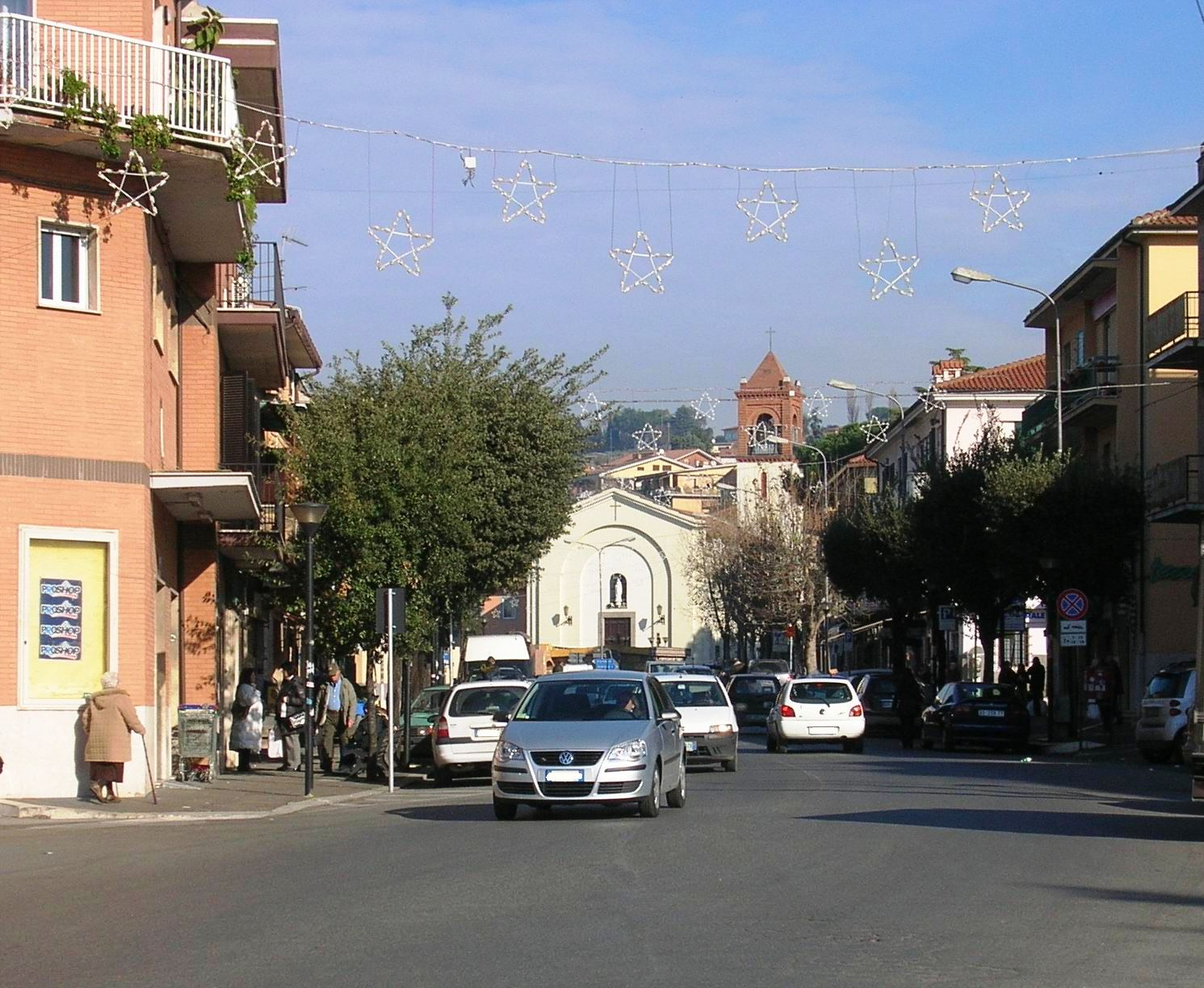

- Location of Cecchina in Italy
- Coordinates: 41°46′N 12°37′E
- Country: Italy
- Region: Lazio
- Province: Rome
- Comune: Albano Laziale; Ariccia; Ardea
- Elevation: 235 m (771 ft)

Population (December 31, 2004)
  - Total: 12,000
- Demonym: Cecchinesi
- Time zone: UTC+1 (CET)
  - Summer (DST): UTC+2 (CEST)
- Postal code: 00041
- Dialing code: 06

Cecchina (Italian pronunciation: [tʃekˈkiːna]) is a town located approximately 30 km south-east of Rome in the Italian region of Lazio, in central Italy.

== Overview ==
The town is a frazione of the comune (municipality) of Albano Laziale; it is part of the famous Castelli Romani; the elevation of the town is about 235 m above sea level and it shares its borders with the municipalities of Ariccia and Ardea. Population is 12,000 inhabitants. The town is on one side of Vallericcia, one of the ancient craters of the Vulcano Laziale (Alban Hills). Cecchina is located at km 9 of Via Nettunense a main road which connects Rome to Anzio.

Patron saint of Cecchina is St. Philip Neri.

== Photogallery ==
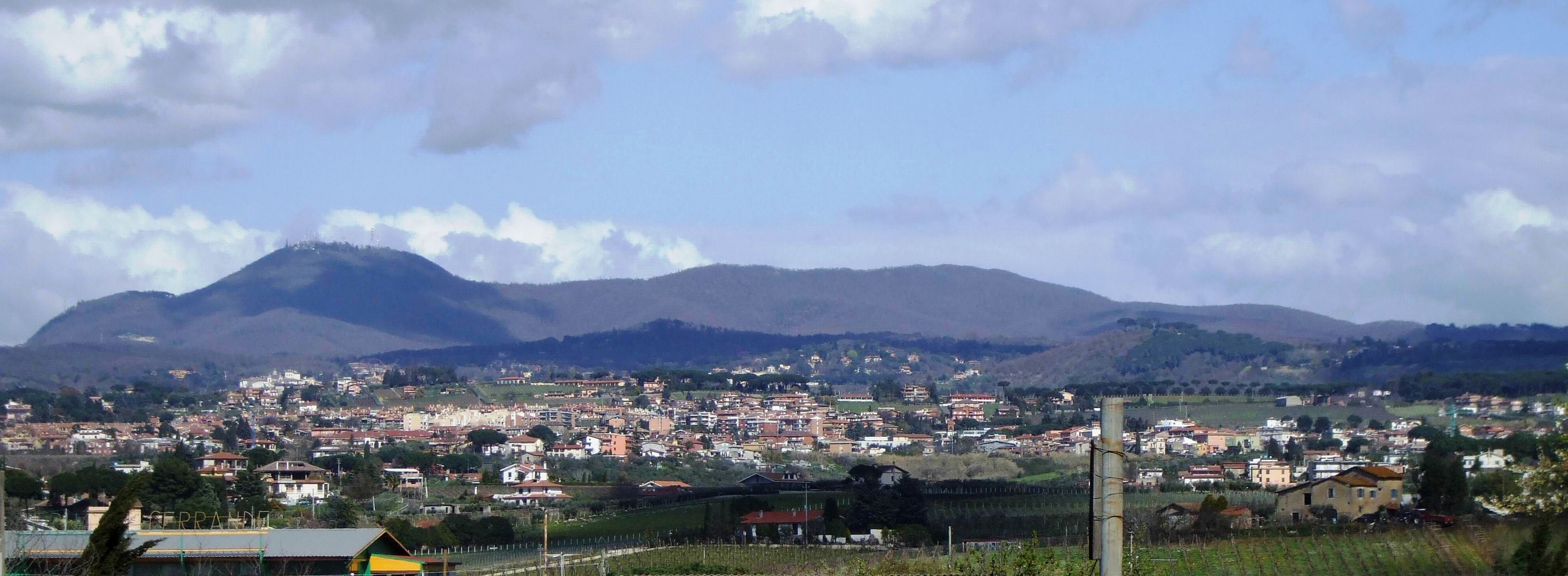
Cecchina view with part of the Alban Hills

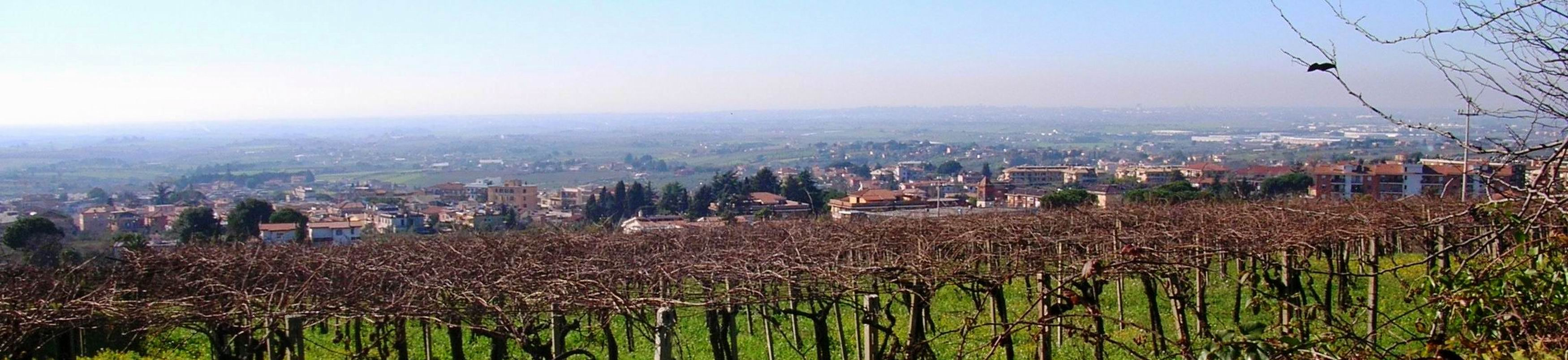
View of Cecchina from the hill called Poggio Ameno

== See also ==
- Pavona
