= Landkern =

- Municipality
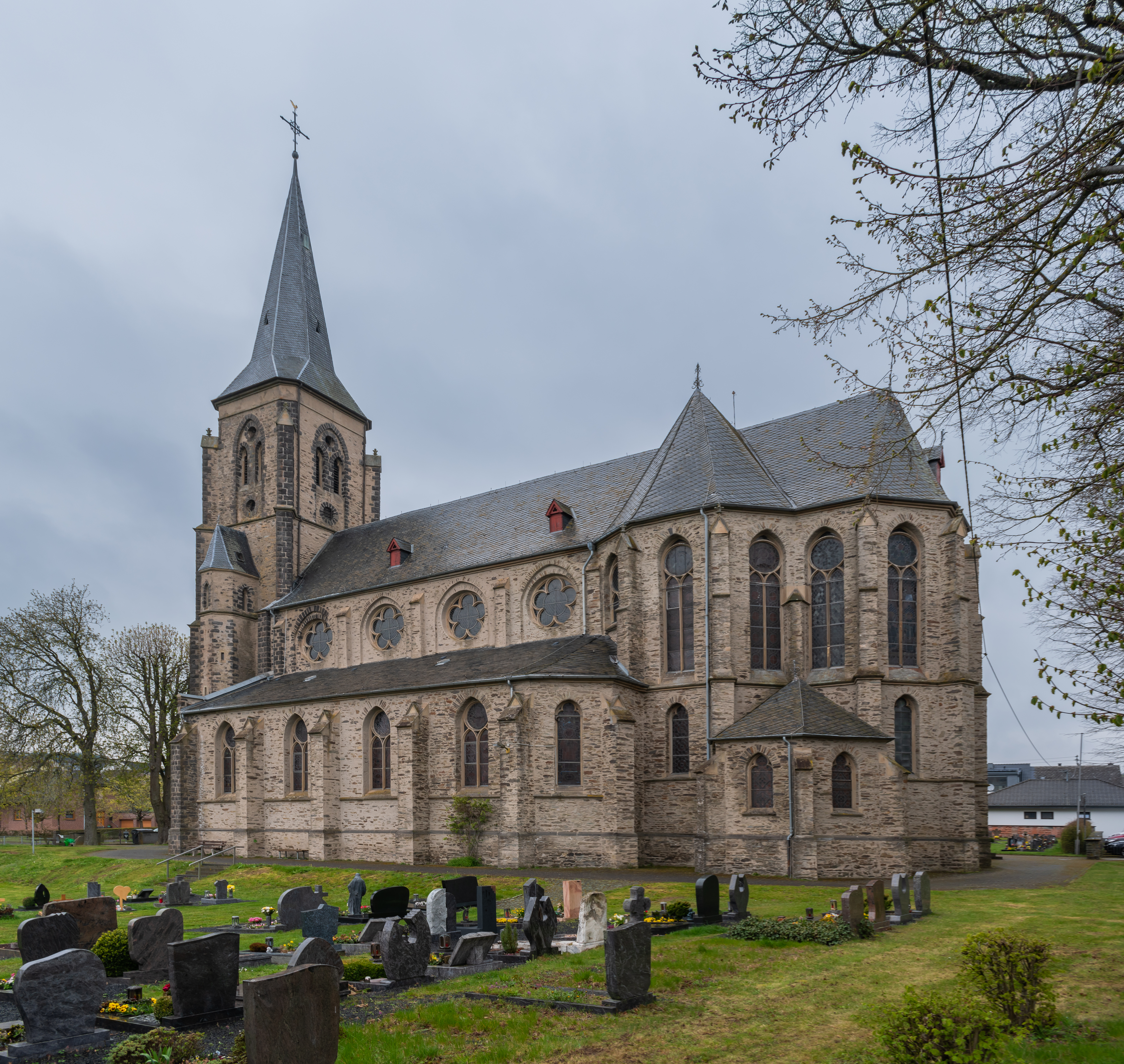
- Saint Servatius church

- Coat of arms

- Location of Landkern within Cochem-Zell district
- Interactive map of Landkern
- Location within Germany Location within Rhineland-Palatinate
- Coordinates: 50°11′38″N 7°09′08″E
- Country: Germany
- State: Rhineland-Palatinate
- District: Cochem-Zell
- Municipal assoc.: Kaisersesch

Government
  - Mayor (2019–24): Thomas Heucher

Area
  - Total: 10.61 km^{2} (4.10 sq mi)
- Elevation: 410 m (1,350 ft)

Population (2025-12-31)
  - Total: 924
  - Density: 87.1/km^{2} (226/sq mi)
- Time zone: UTC+01:00 (CET)
  - Summer (DST): UTC+02:00 (CEST)
- Postal codes: 56814 (OT Neuhof: 56759)
- Dialling codes: 02653
- Vehicle registration: COC
- Website: www.landkern.de

Landkern is an Ortsgemeinde – a municipality belonging to a Verbandsgemeinde, a kind of collective municipality – in the Cochem-Zell district in Rhineland-Palatinate, in western Germany. It belongs to the Verbandsgemeinde of Kaisersesch, whose seat is in the like-named town.

== Geography ==
=== Location ===
The municipality lies on the eastern edge of the Endert valley between Cochem and Kaisersesch, a few kilometres from the river Moselle. The municipality's wooded area totals 3.63 km².

=== Neighbouring municipalities ===
Landkern's neighbours are Illerich to the east and Greimersburg to the west.

== History ==
Kern, as the village was called in the Middle Ages, had its first documentary mention about 1051 when Richeza, who was a Rhenish count palatine's granddaughter and former Polish queen who had been driven from her adopted homeland, and who had been living in nearby Klotten, made a great many donations to the Brauweiler Monastery near Cologne, among which was an estate at Kern.

Kern was quite possibly the smallest village of the many that belonged to the Klotten high court region in those days. One by one, Klotten relinquished the parishes of Urschmitt, Kaifenheim and Hambuch, thus leaving only the villages of Greimersburg, Landkern, Illerich and Wirfus in the parish by 1335. These four villages, however, found this rather annoying. Thus, they made a petition to Archbishop Richard von Greifenklau in Trier, which was signed by the reeves of Greimersburg, Landkern, Illerich and Wirfus and by the estate holders in Esper, Fahrenday, Neuhof, Kaveloch and Annisch.

On 21 January 1512, the Archbishop granted the request and approved Sunday Mass to be held alternately at the chapels in Kern and Illerich. In the document from the Foundation, though, it was expressly stated that all members of these affiliated congregations were to attend Mass, along with their chaplains, at the parish church in Klotten on the following holidays: Good Friday, Easter, Whitsun, the Assumption, All Hallows, Christmas and Candlemas. It was also set forth that the chaplain was to "have an abode near the chapel at Kern and enough cropland, meadowland and freely from our livestock 50 sheep, 5 swine and 4 cows." Baptisms were sometimes held in Kern, but they were recorded in the baptismal register in Klotten.

Kern was not left unscathed by the Thirty Years' War. In 1620, soldiers stole the holy vessels. The same happened in Greimersburg, and in 1656, the chapel at Illerich lay in rubble. Population figures from the time, shown here together with those for Greimersburg, give some idea of the kind of times that these were:

| Year | Hearths in Kern | Hearths in Greimersburg |
| 1563 | 14 | 26 |
| 1680 | 14 | 18 |
| 1684 | 12 | 22 |

A "hearth" – or household – contained on average seven persons, but sometimes as many as ten.

In the two centuries that followed, the population grew considerably. In 1717, Landkern had 17 families, and in 1778 there were 137 inhabitants. In 1832, Landkern had 56 families (308 inhabitants). Population figures for 1848 and 1872 were 441 and 589 respectively.

It was this population growth that led to the building of the new parish church, which still stands today. The foundation stone was laid on 14 August 1859.

On 21 June 1726, the four Bergdörfer ("Mountain Villages") at last got their wish and were split from the parish of Klotten, with that municipality's agreement. The first Landkern parish priest, Father Franz Wilhelmy, born in Hambuch, began keeping the baptismal and death registers in 1728. The new parish comprised not only the four Bergdörfer but also the estates of Esper (first mentioned in 1399) and Fahrenday (mentioned in a document from 1431).

The chapel in Landkern, first mentioned in 1511, whose patron even then was Saint Servatius, was succeeded by another chapel on 13 August 1737, less than a decade after the first parish priest had arrived. The new church was a small, east-oriented building with a tall west tower and stood parallel to the road towards Greimersburg. The cost had to be borne by parochial funds while the municipality had to come up with the wherewithal for the tower.

The chapel mentioned in 1511 had two altars, whereas the new church had three. This church lasted until it was replaced with yet another, which was consecrated on 22 July 1862. It was also at this time that the organ was built into the church.

Four times between 1777 and 1860, bells were consecrated, and three new ones were mentioned in 1861. Only one of these survived the Second World War.

In 1630, Kern still had no school. The villagers brought this subject up at the Visitations that were held from time to time, and eventually a school appeared. The first schoolteacher known to history in Landkern was Peter Schnitzler. He died in 1769. In 1779, 29 boys and 9 girls were attending this school. The tuition for the (agricultural) Winterschule ("Winter School") was 13 Albus, and for Sunday school and holiday school it was 3 Albus.

Only once has there ever actually been a priest from Landkern. This was Father Johann Peter Bast, born on 1 May 1881, but he entered the priesthood in the U.S. state of Kansas.

Two estates now belong to Landkern. One is Esper, and the other is Dreifaltigkeit ("Trinity"). There are also three outlying centres, Neuhof, Meilenstein and Jorscheid, along with individual houses of Schöne Aussicht. All together, there are just under 900 inhabitants.

Beginning in 1794, Landkern lay under French rule, and by 1800 it had been assigned to the canton of Kaisersesch. In 1815 it was assigned to the Kingdom of Prussia at the Congress of Vienna. Since 1946, it has been part of the then newly founded state of Rhineland-Palatinate.

=== Name ===
The municipality's name was originally Kern, but since the 18th century, the name Landkern has been customary. Landkern was once also called Feldkern.

== Politics ==
=== Municipal council ===
The council is made up of 12 council members, who were elected at the municipal election held on 7 June 2009, and the honorary mayor as chairman.

The municipal election held on 7 June 2009 yielded the following results:

| | FWG Münich | WG Bretz | WG Mohrs | Total |
| 2009 | 7 | 3 | 2 | 12 seats |
| 2004 | 7 | 5 | - | 12 seats |

=== Mayor ===
Landkern's mayor is Thomas Heucher.

=== Coat of arms ===
The municipality's arms might be described thus: Per saltire, first gules a wooden shoe Or, second argent issuant from the line of partition an abbot's staff sable, third argent a bear's gambe couped at the shoulder palewise embowed of the fourth armed of the third, and fourth vert a kernel bendwise of the second.

The wooden shoe is Saint Servatius’s attribute, thus representing the church's patron saint. The abbot's staff refers to Brauweiler Abbey, which after Queen Richeza's bequest in 1053 had extensive holdings in Landkern. The bear's paw is a legacy from Klotten. The municipality was formerly part of the parish and high court district of Klotten, both of which bore arms charged with Saint Maximin and his attribute, a bear. The golden kernel is a canting charge, since the word for one of these in German is Kern, the municipality's former name. The tincture vert (green) in this same field refers to agriculture, which is important in Landkern even today.

The arms have been borne since 16 July 1980.

== Culture and sightseeing ==
=== Buildings ===
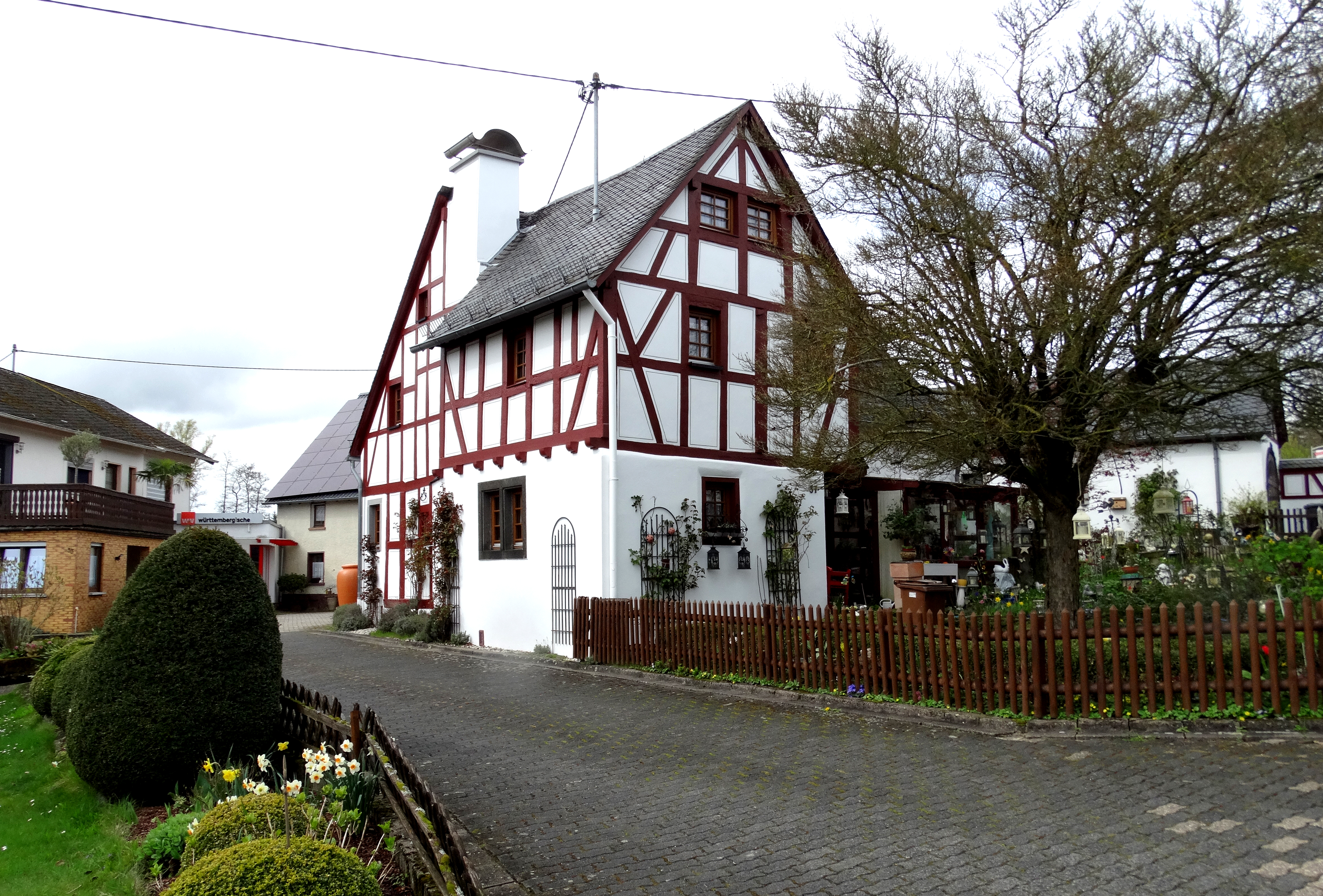
Timber-framed house at Hauptstraße 37

The following are listed buildings or sites in Rhineland-Palatinate’s Directory of Cultural Monuments:

- Saint Servatius’s Catholic Parish Church (Pfarrkirche St. Servatius), Hauptstraße 9 – Gothic Revival basilica, slate quarrystone, 1859–1862, architect Vincenz Statz (1819–1898), Cologne, west tower 1892-1894 replaced by new building; whole complex with graveyard: sandstone Gothic Revival graveyard cross, latter half of the 19th century; warriors' memorial, Archangel Michael, 1920s
- Bergstraße – Heiligenhäuschen (a small, shrinelike structure consecrated to a saint or saints), 19th century
- Hauptstraße 23 – former rectory; timber-frame house, partly solid, from 1668; timber-frame barn, partly solid, from 1780; stable, 19th century
- Hauptstraße 37 – L-shaped complex; timber-frame house and timber-frame house, partly solid, essentially from the 18th century, alterations in the 19th century
- Unterer Berg 1 – estate along the street; one-floor timber-frame house, partly plastered, essentially from the 18th century, remodelled in the 19th century
- On Kreisstraße (District Road) 17, going towards Greimersburg – Heiligenhäuschen; plastered building with relief, 18th century
- On Landesstraße (State Road) 107 – milestone, basalt obelisk

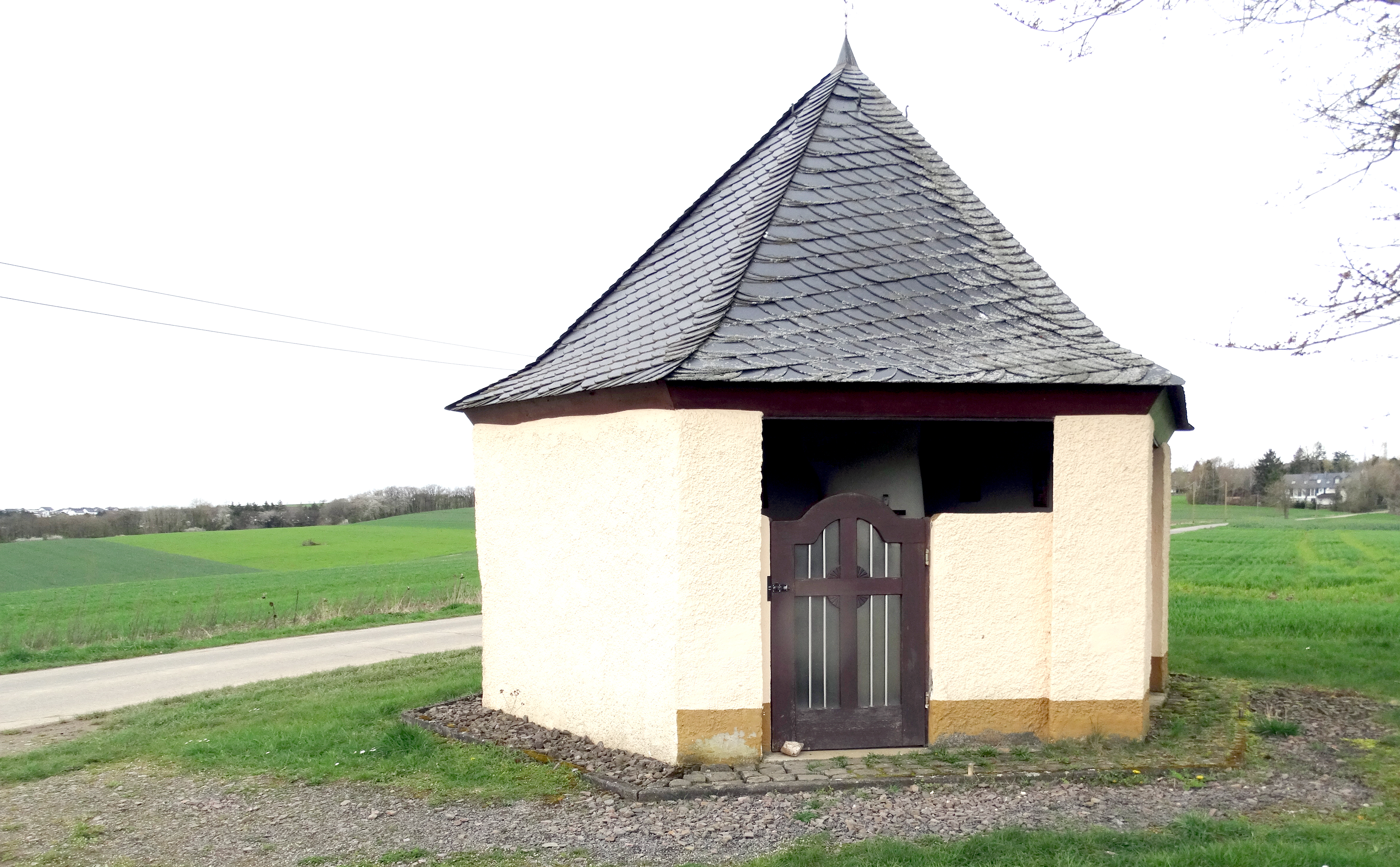
Trinity Chapel

- Southeast of Landkern – Dreifaltigkeitskapelle ("Trinity Chapel"); six-sided plastered building, pyramidal roof, 18th century, wayside cross inside; four reliefs, 18th century, one from 1787; sandstone grave cross fragment, from 1819

=== Clubs ===
- Landkerner Carneval-Club (Carnival)
- Heimat- und Verkehrsverein (local history and transport)
- Kirchenchor St. Cäcilia (church choir)
- SV Blau-Weiß 1922 (sport)
- Volunteer fire brigade
- Frauengemeinschaft Landkern ("women's association")
- Jugendgruppe Landkern ("youth group")

== Economy and infrastructure ==
=== Transport ===
There is a regular bus link to Cochem and Kaisersesch, where the nearest railway stations are to be found.

=== Education ===
The municipality has at its disposal one primary school and one kindergarten.
