= Illerich =

- Municipality
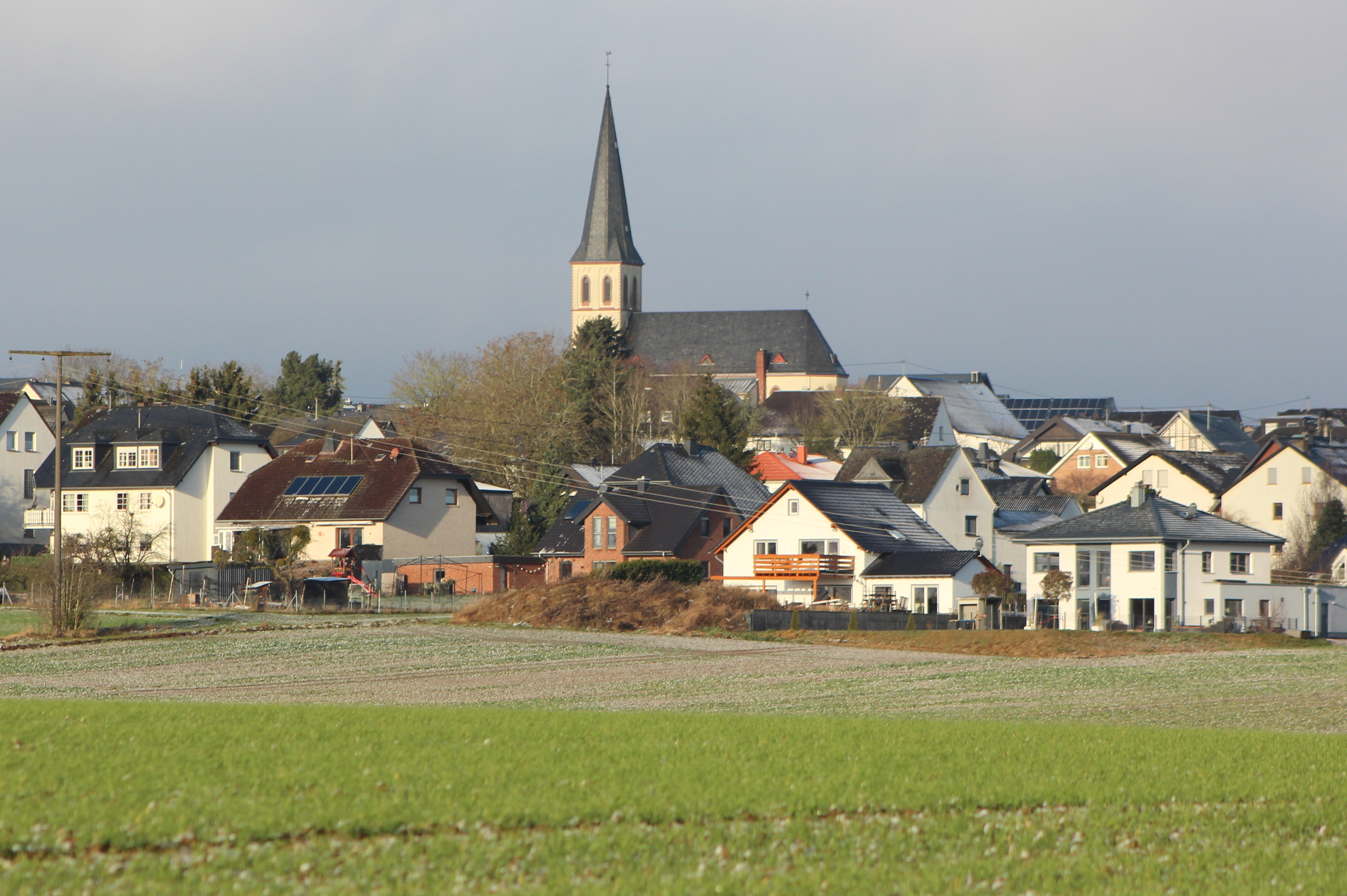

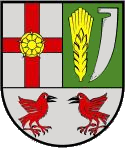
- Coat of arms

- Location of Illerich within Cochem-Zell district
- Interactive map of Illerich
- Location within Germany Location within Rhineland-Palatinate
- Coordinates: 50°12′00″N 7°10′47″E
- Country: Germany
- State: Rhineland-Palatinate
- District: Cochem-Zell
- Municipal assoc.: Kaisersesch

Government
  - Mayor (2019–24): Helmut Braunschädel

Area
  - Total: 7.74 km^{2} (2.99 sq mi)
- Elevation: 365 m (1,198 ft)

Population (2025-12-31)
  - Total: 816
  - Density: 105/km^{2} (273/sq mi)
- Time zone: UTC+01:00 (CET)
  - Summer (DST): UTC+02:00 (CEST)
- Postal codes: 56814
- Dialling codes: 02653
- Vehicle registration: COC
- Website: www.illerich.de

Illerich is an Ortsgemeinde – a municipality belonging to a Verbandsgemeinde, a kind of collective municipality – in the Cochem-Zell district in Rhineland-Palatinate, Germany. It belongs to the Verbandsgemeinde of Kaisersesch, whose seat is in the like-named town.

== Geography ==
=== Location ===
The municipality, characterized by agriculture, lies in the Eifel some 50 km southwest of Koblenz, near the Moselle valley.

=== Neighbouring municipalities ===
Landkern lies just to the west, and Wirfus to the east.

== History ==
About 1180, Illerich had its first certain documentary mention in the St. Matthias Mirakeln, which mentioned a “wonderful event” in villa Elrecha. The first documentary mention with an exact date comes from 1256; it is a document under whose terms Archbishop Arnold II of Isenburg approved the transfer of bondsmen from Ilriche to Himmerod Abbey. A document dated 15 August 1324, in which Sir Paul von Eich, Electoral-Trier Burgrave at Neuerburg, is named as the owner of holdings in Illerich, mentions the donation of an estate in Illerich to Rosenthal Monastery in 1321. It was also mentioned in 1331 that Himmerod Abbey had holdings here. Further holdings in Illerich (1331 and 1338) were owned by, among others, the noblemen Hermann von Bachem and Johann von Pommern. Illerich belonged along with Landkern to the Klotten High Court, and then later to the Electoral-Trier Amt of Cochem, eventually being grouped into the Cochem district in 1815.

Before 1400, Diedrich, Lord at Daun was the tithe lord. Together with his wife Luzie, he transferred the tithing rights to Hentzen, called Speiss, the Schultheiß in Kaisersesch, as a fief.

The next tithe lord after Daun was Manderscheid, for on 10 October 1493, Johann, Burgrave of Manderscheid and Count of Blankenheim, and his wife, Margret von der Mark gave each of their daughters Anna and Irmgard at the Marienberg Convent 20 Malter of grain from their tithes in Illerich. In 1569, the whole tithe of 50 Malter was shared by the Junkers of Gerolstein and Haust von Ulmen. In 1680, the families of the Count of Gerolstein and the Count of Pützfeld were mentioned.

Towards the end of the 18th century, the tithes from Illerich were the subject of disagreement between the Countess of Sternberg and the Abbot of Brauweiler, leading to a rather lengthy court case between 1783 and 1787.

Beginning in 1794, Illerich lay under French rule. In 1815 it was assigned to the Kingdom of Prussia at the Congress of Vienna. Since 1946, it has been part of the then newly founded state of Rhineland-Palatinate.

== Politics ==
=== Municipal council ===
The council is made up of 12 council members, who were elected by majority vote at the municipal election held on 7 June 2009, and the honorary mayor as chairman.

=== Mayor ===
Illerich's mayor is Helmut Braunschädel, and his deputies are Werner Süß and Peter Gerhartz.

=== Coat of arms ===
The German blazon reads: Das Wappen der Ortsgemeinde Illerich ist über einem silbernen Schildfuß, in dem zwei rote Raben enthalten sind, gespalten von Rot und Silber. Vorne ist ein rotes Balkenkreuz dargestellt, in der Mitte belegt von einer goldenen Rose, hinten eine goldene Ähre und ein silbernes Sensenblatt pfahlweise.

The municipality's arms might in English heraldic language be described thus: Per pale argent a cross gules surmounted by a rose Or and vert an ear of wheat couped of the third and a scythe blade palewise, the point to base, of the first, in a base of the first two ravens, wings endorsed, of the second, armed sable, the one to dexter sinister.

The version shown at the municipality's website shows the cross “enhanced”, that is, with the crossbeam slightly raised above centre.

The cross refers to the village's former allegiance to the Electorate of Trier. The rose recalls Rosenthal Monastery, which had holdings in the village as long ago as 1331. Illerich grew up in early times from an estate to today's municipality, in which agriculture has been practised to the present day. Referring to this are the ear of wheat and the scythe blade. The charge in the base, the two ravens, are Saint Vincent's attribute, thus representing the municipality's and the church's patron saint, who has enjoyed this distinction since 1569.

== Culture and sightseeing ==
=== Buildings ===
The following are listed buildings or sites in Rhineland-Palatinate’s Directory of Cultural Monuments:

- Saint Vincent's Catholic Parish Church (Pfarrkirche St. Vinzenz), Kirchstraße 2 – Gothic Revival pseudo-basilica, 1896–1897, architect Lambert von Fisenne, Gelsenkirchen; Gothic Revival cross, from 1860
- Friedhofsstraße – fountain, 19th century (?)
- Friedhofsstraße – 23 boundary stones, some from 1775
- On Kreisstraße 24, going towards Kaisersesch – wayside chapel, 19th century
- On Landesstraße 24, going towards Wirfus – wayside cross; basalt niche cross, 17th century
- South of Illerich on Landesstraße 107 – basalt wayside cross, from 1686
