= Greimersburg =

- Municipality
- Location of Greimersburg within Cochem-Zell district
- Interactive map of Greimersburg
- Location within Germany Location within Rhineland-Palatinate
- Coordinates: 50°11′6.24″N 7°8′23.16″E
- Country: Germany
- State: Rhineland-Palatinate
- District: Cochem-Zell
- Municipal assoc.: Cochem

Government
  - Mayor (2019–24): Hans-Werner Junglas

Area
  - Total: 10.16 km^{2} (3.92 sq mi)
- Elevation: 420 m (1,380 ft)

Population (2025-12-31)
  - Total: 710
  - Density: 70/km^{2} (180/sq mi)
- Time zone: UTC+01:00 (CET)
  - Summer (DST): UTC+02:00 (CEST)
- Postal codes: 56814
- Dialling codes: 02671
- Vehicle registration: COC
- Website: www.greimersburg.de

Greimersburg is an Ortsgemeinde – a municipality belonging to a Verbandsgemeinde, a kind of collective municipality – in the Cochem-Zell district in Rhineland-Palatinate, Germany. It belongs to the Verbandsgemeinde of Cochem, whose seat is in the like-named town.

== Geography ==
The municipality lies in the Eifel between Trier and Koblenz near the towns of Cochem on the Moselle and Kaisersesch.

== History ==
In the 7th century, Greimersburg had its first documentary mention as one of Frankish ruler Pepin the Elder’s holdings. Electoral-Trier overlordship was swept away in 1794 by the French Revolutionary occupation. In 1815 Greimersburg was assigned to the Kingdom of Prussia at the Congress of Vienna. Since 1946, it has been part of the then newly founded state of Rhineland-Palatinate.

=== Religion ===
Until 1728, Greimersburg was assigned to the Catholic parish of Klotten. Today it forms a parish together with Landkern.

== Politics ==
=== Municipal council ===
The council is made up of 12 council members, who were elected at the municipal election held on 7 June 2009, and the honorary mayor as chairman.

The municipal election held on 7 June 2009 yielded the following results:

	Lauxen	Krämer	Total
2009	9	3	12 seats
2004	10	2	12 seats

=== Mayor ===
Greimersburg’s mayor is Hans-Werner Junglas, elected in 2012. He succeeded Paul Lauxen who held this position since 2001.

=== Coat of arms ===
The German blazon reads: In Silber, ein durchgehendes rotes Kreuz belegt mit einem schwarzen Schild, darin ein goldener Kreuzstab mit daran hängenden silbernen Glöckchen.

The municipality’s arms might in English heraldic language be described thus: Argent a cross gules surmounted by an inescutcheon sable charged with a cross tau Or, hanging from each of whose arms a bell of the first.

The arms were designed by A. Friderichs of Zell.

== Culture and sightseeing ==
=== Buildings ===
The following are listed buildings or sites in Rhineland-Palatinate’s Directory of Cultural Monuments:

- St. Antonius Abbas Catholic Chapel; aisleless church, 1777, expanded with a schoolhouse in 1867; basalt warriors’ memorial with relief
- Hauptstraße (no number): estate complex; timber-frame house, partly solid, 18th century, shed/stable
- Hauptstraße 36: timber-frame house, plastered and slated, 18th century (?)
- Landkerner Straße 2: barn with oven, 19th century
- On Landesstraße (State Road) 98, going towards Landkern: wayside chapel, from 1861
- North of Greimersburg: basalt wayside cross from 1776
- South of Greimersburg: basalt wayside cross from 1790
- Southwest of Greimersburg: basalt wayside cross; niche cross, 17th century (?)

=== Natural monuments ===
- Tal der Wilden Endert (“Valley of the Wild Endert”) with its former mills.
