= Wirfus =

- Municipality
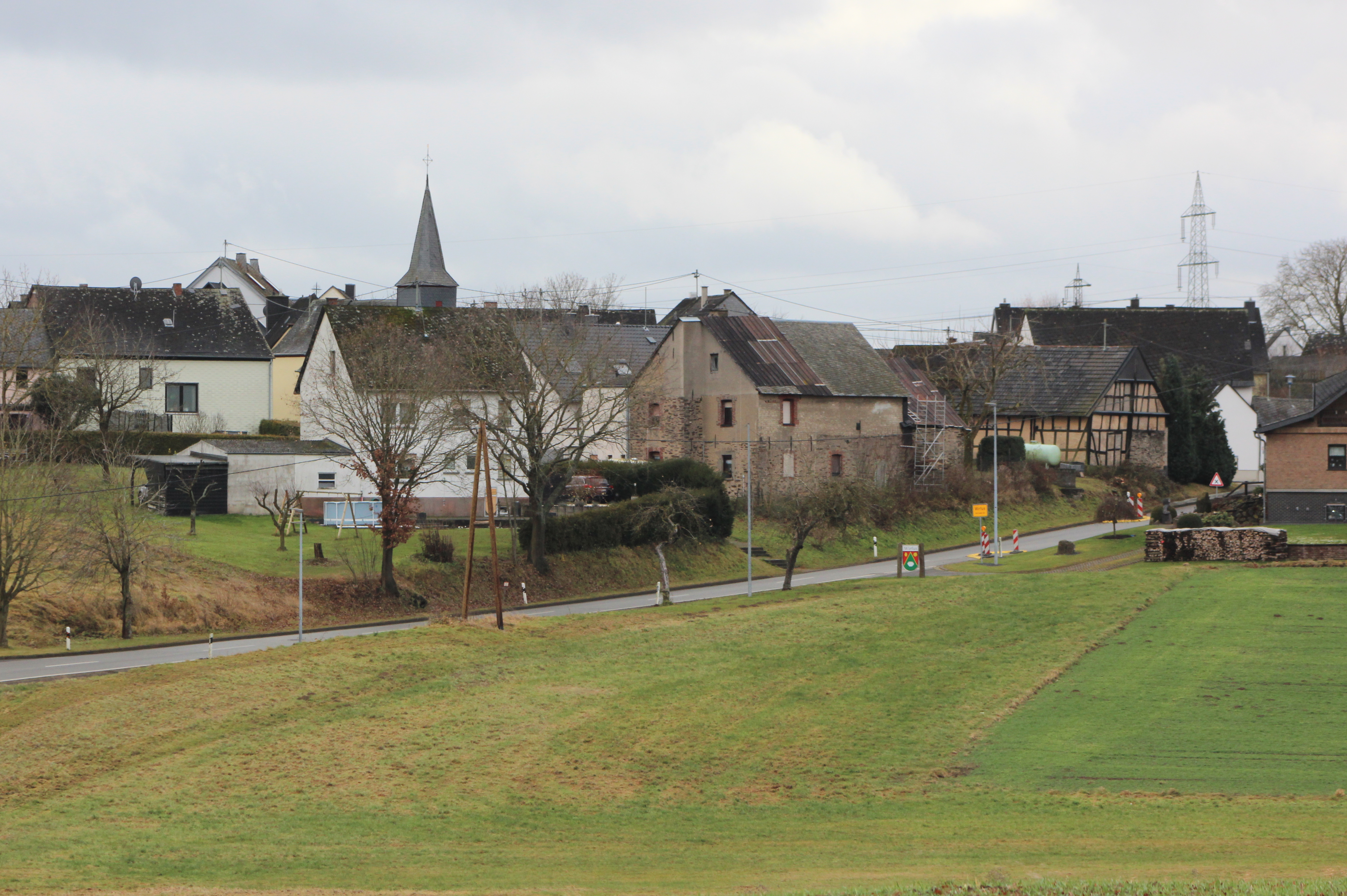

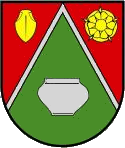
- Coat of arms

- Location of Wirfus within Cochem-Zell district
- Interactive map of Wirfus
- Location within Germany Location within Rhineland-Palatinate
- Coordinates: 50°12′6″N 7°12′22″E
- Country: Germany
- State: Rhineland-Palatinate
- District: Cochem-Zell
- Municipal assoc.: Cochem

Government
  - Mayor (2019–24): Herbert Thönnes

Area
  - Total: 4.65 km^{2} (1.80 sq mi)
- Elevation: 342 m (1,122 ft)

Population (2025-12-31)
  - Total: 239
  - Density: 51.4/km^{2} (133/sq mi)
- Time zone: UTC+01:00 (CET)
  - Summer (DST): UTC+02:00 (CEST)
- Postal codes: 56814
- Dialling codes: 02653
- Vehicle registration: COC

Wirfus is an Ortsgemeinde – a municipality belonging to a Verbandsgemeinde, a kind of collective municipality – in the Cochem-Zell district in Rhineland-Palatinate, Germany. It belongs to the Verbandsgemeinde of Cochem, whose seat is in the like-named town.

== Geography ==
=== Location ===
The municipality lies in the Eifel about 1.5 km east of Illerich and roughly 6 km north of the river Moselle.

== History ==
Barrow groups point to early settlement of what is now Wirfus. In 1056, the municipality had its first documentary mention.

With the occupation of the Rhine’s left bank by French Revolutionary troops in 1794, the Electorate of Trier, for centuries the local overlord, fell. In 1814 Wirfus was assigned to the Kingdom of Prussia at the Congress of Vienna. Since 1946, it has been part of the then newly founded state of Rhineland-Palatinate.

== Politics ==
=== Municipal council ===
The council is made up of 7 council members, who were elected by majority vote at the municipal election held on 7 June 2009, and the honorary mayor as chairman.

=== Mayor ===
Wirfus's mayor is Herbert Thönnes, and his deputies are Resi Henzgen and Reiner Geyermann.

=== Coat of arms ===
The German blazon reads: Wappen durch goldenen Stabsparren geteilt, oben rechts in Rot goldene Pflugschar, oben links in Rot goldene Rose, unten in Grün silberne Urne.

The municipality's arms might in English heraldic language be described thus: Gules a pile transposed Or surmounted by a pile transposed vert charged with an urn argent, in dexter chief a ploughshare affronty and in sinister chief a rose of the second.

The arms were designed by A. Friderichs and J. Junglas.

== Culture and sightseeing ==
=== Buildings ===
The following are listed buildings or sites in Rhineland-Palatinate’s Directory of Cultural Monuments:

- Saint Margaret's Catholic Church (Kirche St. Margaretha), Kirchstraße 8 – Late Gothic quire, Baroque aisleless church, 1770; on the church: basalt niche cross, marked 1739
- Hauptstraße – fountain, early 19th century
- Hauptstraße/corner of Kirchstraße – five boundary stones, one marked 1689
- Illericher Straße – basalt wayside cross, 18th century
- On Kreisstraße 24 going towards Illerich – wayside cross; basalt niche cross, marked 1675
- On Kreisstraße 25 going towards Klotten – grave cross, marked 1684
- On Kreisstraße 25 – wayside cross, marked 1907
- Junction of Kreisstraße 25 and Landesstraße 107 – basalt wayside cross, marked 1777

=== Rosental Chapel ===
The Rosental Chapel was renovated from the ground up in the 1960s by Johannes Junglas, who was born on 12 February 1898 in Wirfus, and who after the Second World War held various high offices of state (State Secretary, Minister). Today a street in Wirfus is named after him.
