= Louis Lenormand =

French architect

- Born: 6 April 1801; Versailles, Yvelines, France
- Died: 11 January 1862 (aged 60); Paris, France
- Occupation: Architect

Louis Lenormand (6 April 1801, Versailles, Yvelines, France – 11 January 1862, Paris, France) was a French architect.

== Biography ==
He was the son of Louis-François Lenormand and Marie-Jeanne-Antoinette Huvé. Grandson of the architect Jean-Jacques Huvé (1742–1808) and nephew of Jean-Jacques-Marie Huvé (1783–1852), he was a student of his uncle and Antoine-François Peyre (1739–1823) at the School of Fine Arts in Paris.

He was the father of the architect Charles Lenormand (1833–1904) and the father-in-law of the architect Jacques Drevet (1832–1900).

He is buried in the Montmartre Cemetery with his wife Uranie-Joséphine de Lavit (1812–1883) and his father-in-law Baron Joseph-Joachim-Bruno de Lavit (1785–1857).

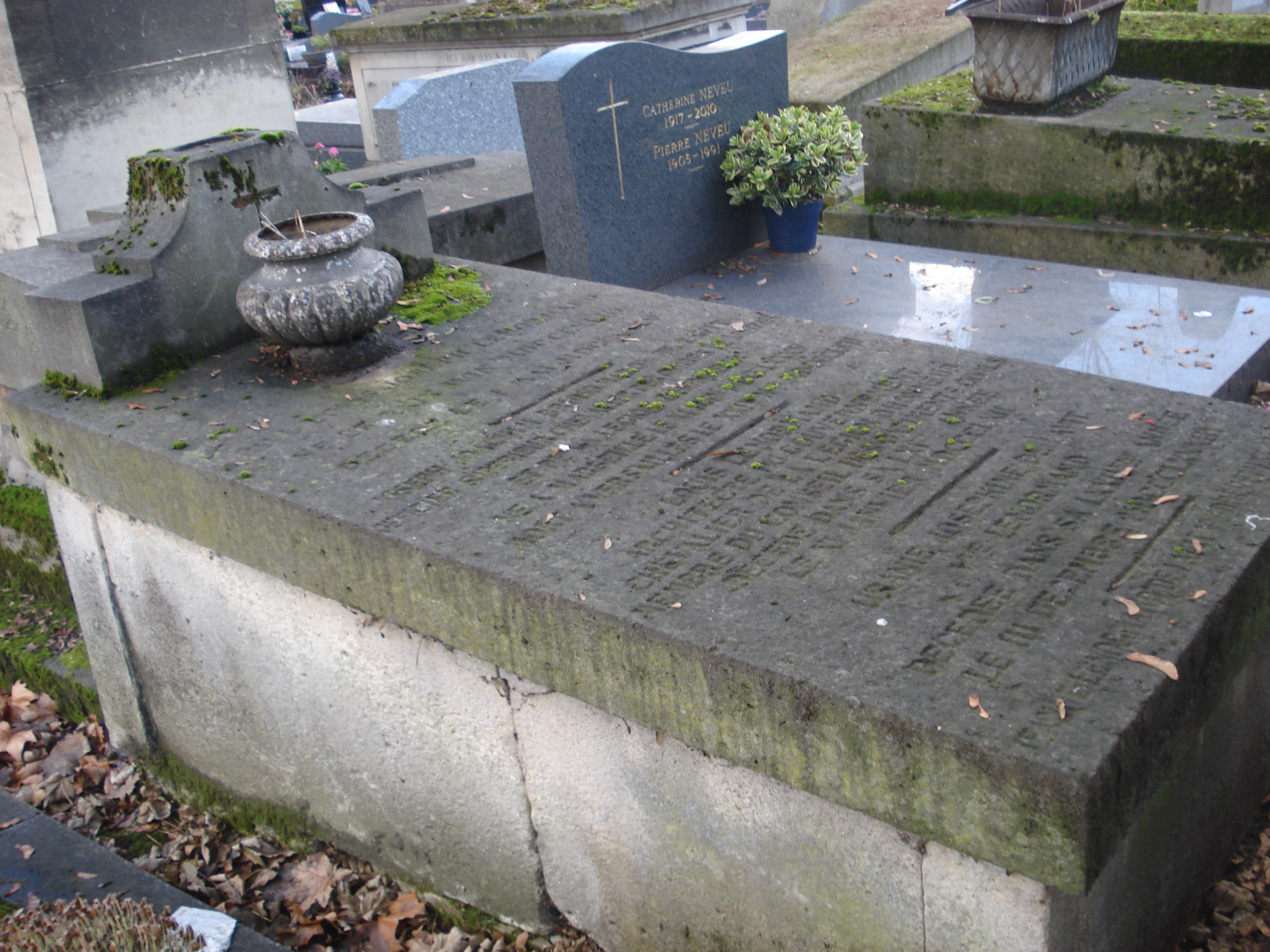
Grave of architect Louis Lenormand - Montmartre Cemetery

He began as a site inspector for the Madeleine Church, in Paris, under the direction of Jean-Jacques-Marie Huvé, and was one of the first architects attached to the Monument historique Commission.

From 1838 until his death, he was the architect of the Court of Cassation. The overall plan of the Palais de Justice was made by Louis Duc and Étienne-Théodore Dommey after the death of Jean-Nicolas Huyot, he designed the plans of the Court of Cassation within the space defined for it and redesigned them four times. At his death, the buildings were barely started. Louis Duc was appointed architect of the Court of Cassation four days after his death. However, since Lenormand's plans were accepted on 11 January 1861, Louis Duc had to adapt to them.

In 1842, he was in charge of the Saint-Jacques Church in Dieppe, and the "restoration" of the Château de Meillant, at the request of its owners, the Mortemarts. He also oversaw the restoration of the Saint-Martin Church in Clamecy and the construction of the Chapelle du Banquet (also in Nièvre), and designed the plans for the Basilique Notre-Dame in Nice.

He was also the architect of the Hôtel du Grand Commandement in Tours, the residence of the military commander of the region under the Second French Empire led by Marshal Baraguey d'Hilliers, his relative.

== Bibliography ==
- French Association for the History of Justice (1992). La justice en ses temples. Regards sur l'architecture judiciaire en France. Éditions Errance. ISBN 978-2-87772-069-4.
