= Chrodoara =

Merovingian noblewoman

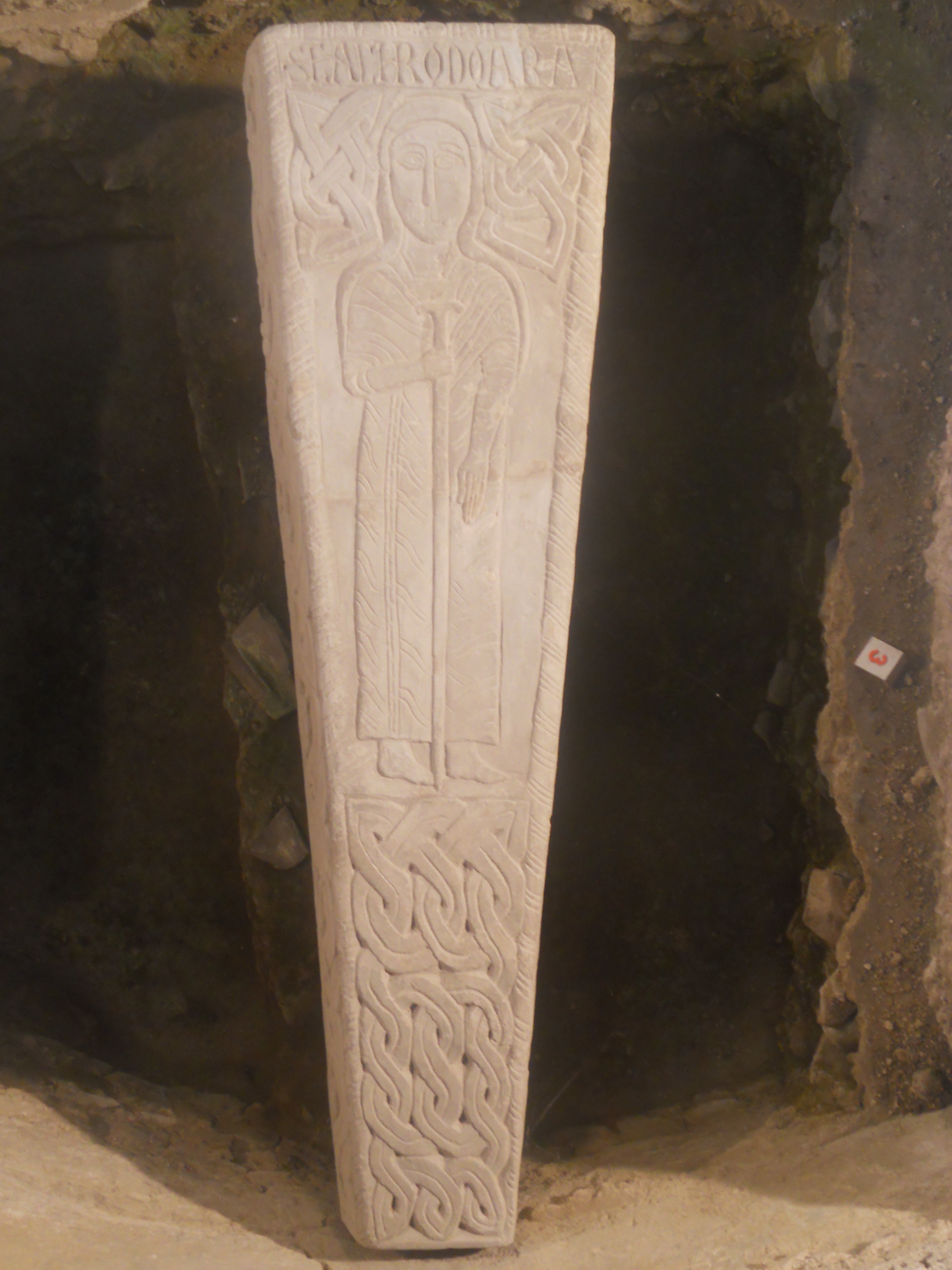
Sarcophagus of Chrodoara in the Collegiate Church of Saint George and Saint Ode

Saint Chrodoara was a Merovingian noblewoman and traditionally the foundress of an abbey in Amay, currently the Collegiate Church of Saint George and Saint Ode in Wallonia, Belgium.

Chrodoara is thought to have been born around the year 560 in Swabia. She was probably married to Bodegisel-Bobo, the son of Mummolin of Soissons. If so, she was widowed around 589. After the death of her husband she moved to Amay and devoted her wealth and her time to the church and works of charity. She died sometime before the year 634 and was buried in the Church of Saint George in Amay. The church is now called "Saint George and Saint Ode", where Ode or Oda, the name dating from the eleventh century, is identified as Chrodoara.

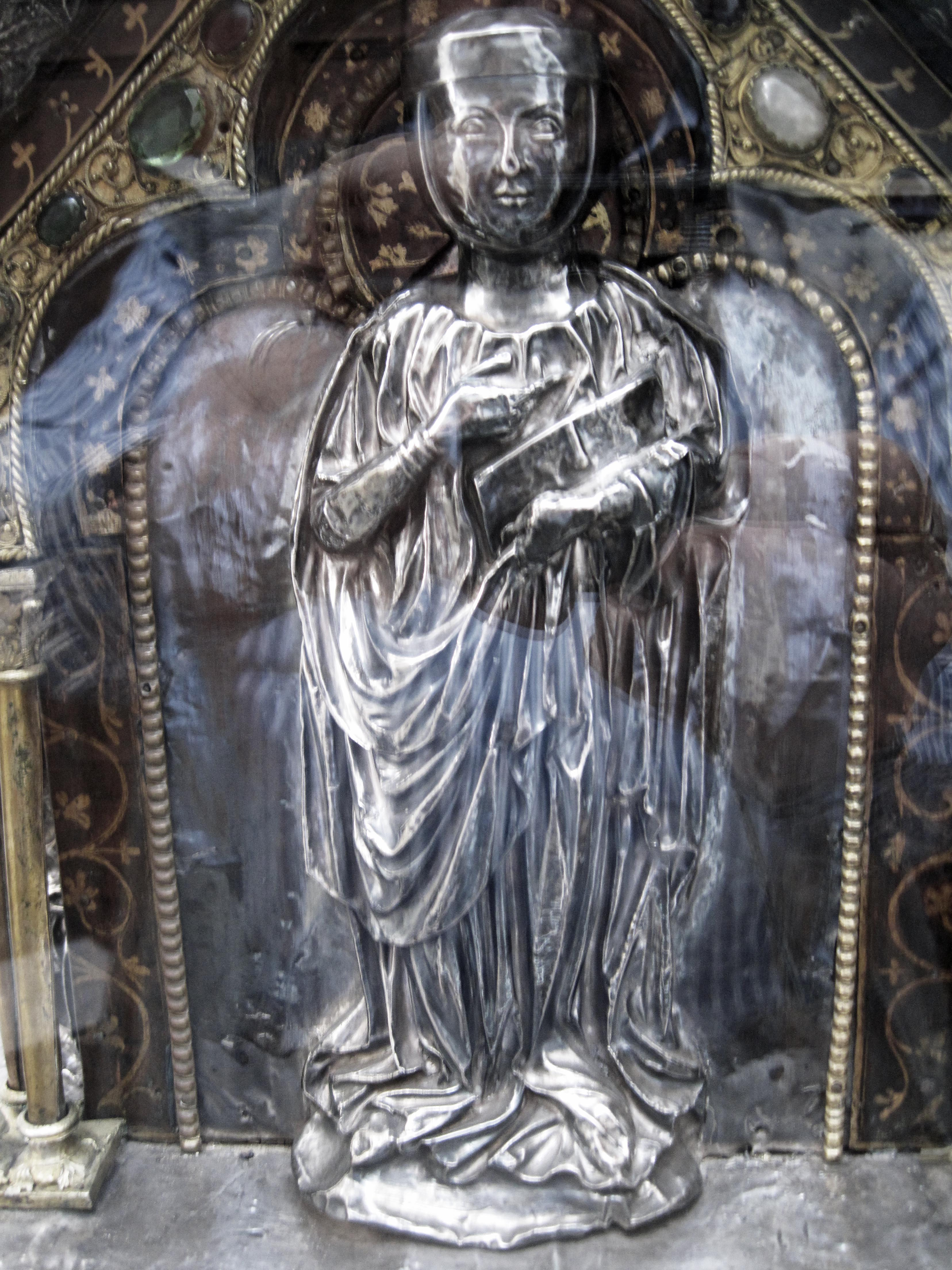
St Ode represented on her shrine in the Amay St George and St Ode church

Chrodoara is said to be the mother of Bishop Arnulf of Metz, and she may have been the grandmother of either Hugobert or of his wife Irmina of Oeren, and thus the great-grandmother of Plectrude, wife of Pepin of Herstal, but the evidence is too late to be relied upon.

In 1977 Chrodoara's sarcophagus was discovered in the choir of the Church of Saint George and Saint Ode. On the cover she is depicted as an abbess holding a staff. However, although she was a patron and benefactor of the abbey she apparently was not an abbess.
