= Mummolin =

Mummolin or Mommolin (Latin: Mummolinus, Mummolenus or Mommolinus) may refer to:

- Mummolin of Soissons, 6th-century nobleman
- Mummolin of Noyon, 7th-century bishop of Tournai and Noyon, saint

== See also ==
- Mummolus of Fleury, 7th-century saint, sometimes called Mummolin
