= Domain of Montreuil =

- Domaine de Montreuil
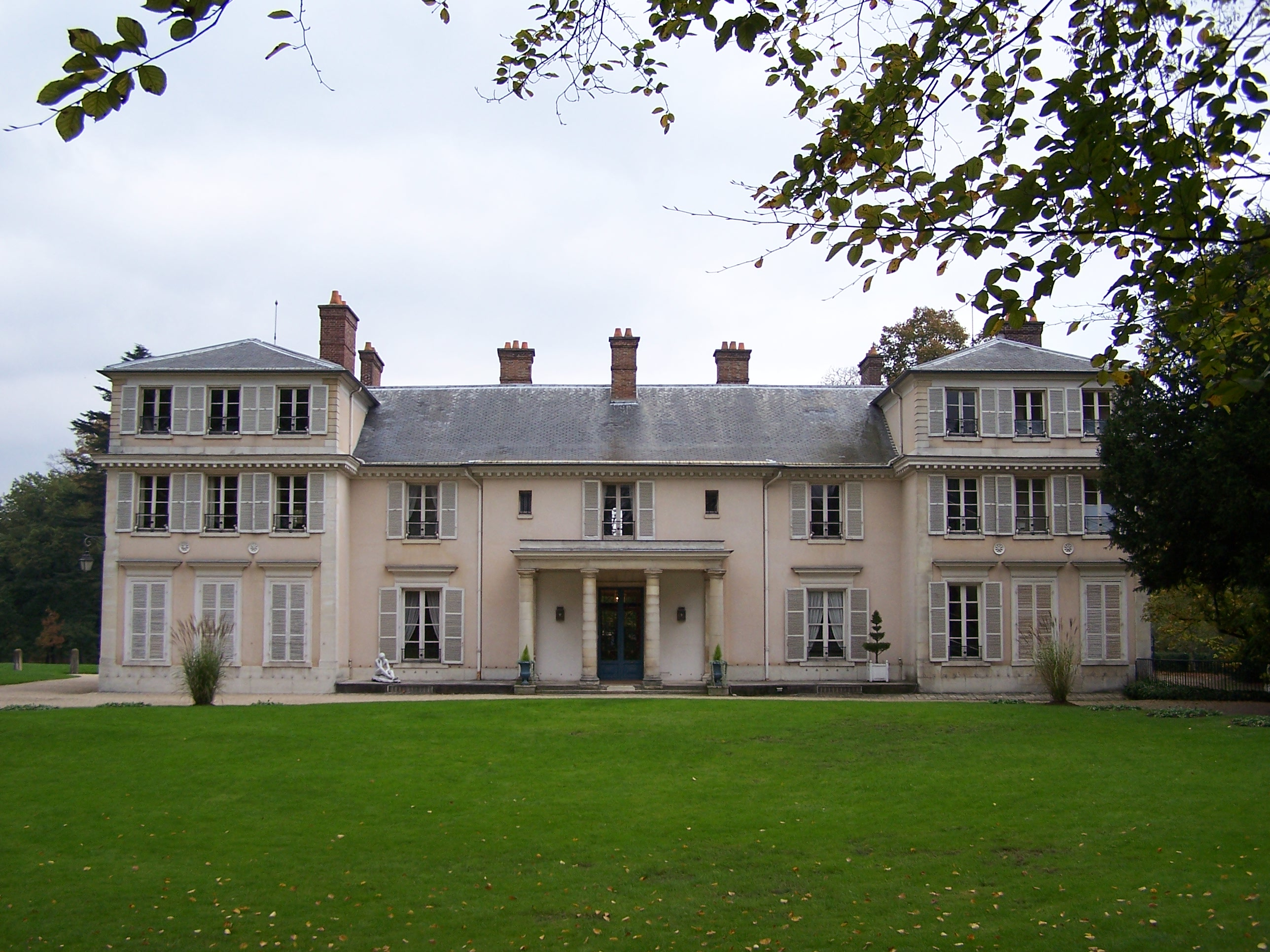
- Château Montreuil

- Location within Île-de-France (region) Location within France

General information
- Status: Museum
- Location: Versailles, France, Domaine de Madame Élisabeth; 73 Avenue de Paris; 78000 Versailles; France
- Coordinates: 48.800278°N 2.145000°E
- Owner: Conseil départemental des Yvelines

Website
- Official Website

The Domain of Montreuil (French: Domaine de Madame Élisabeth) is located in the center of Versailles and encompasses 7.2 hectares of land. Louis XVI bought it in 1783 for his sister Elisabeth of France, known as Madame Élisabeth.

== History ==
Originally a seigneurie from the twelfth century, Montreuil hosted a fortress in 1375. The domain was annexed into the Royal Estates, and was ceded to the Célestins of Paris by Charles VI of France. It was later integrated into the domain of Versailles at the time of Louis XV. The source that feeds the ponds today made it a fashionable place where members of the Court built beautiful properties.

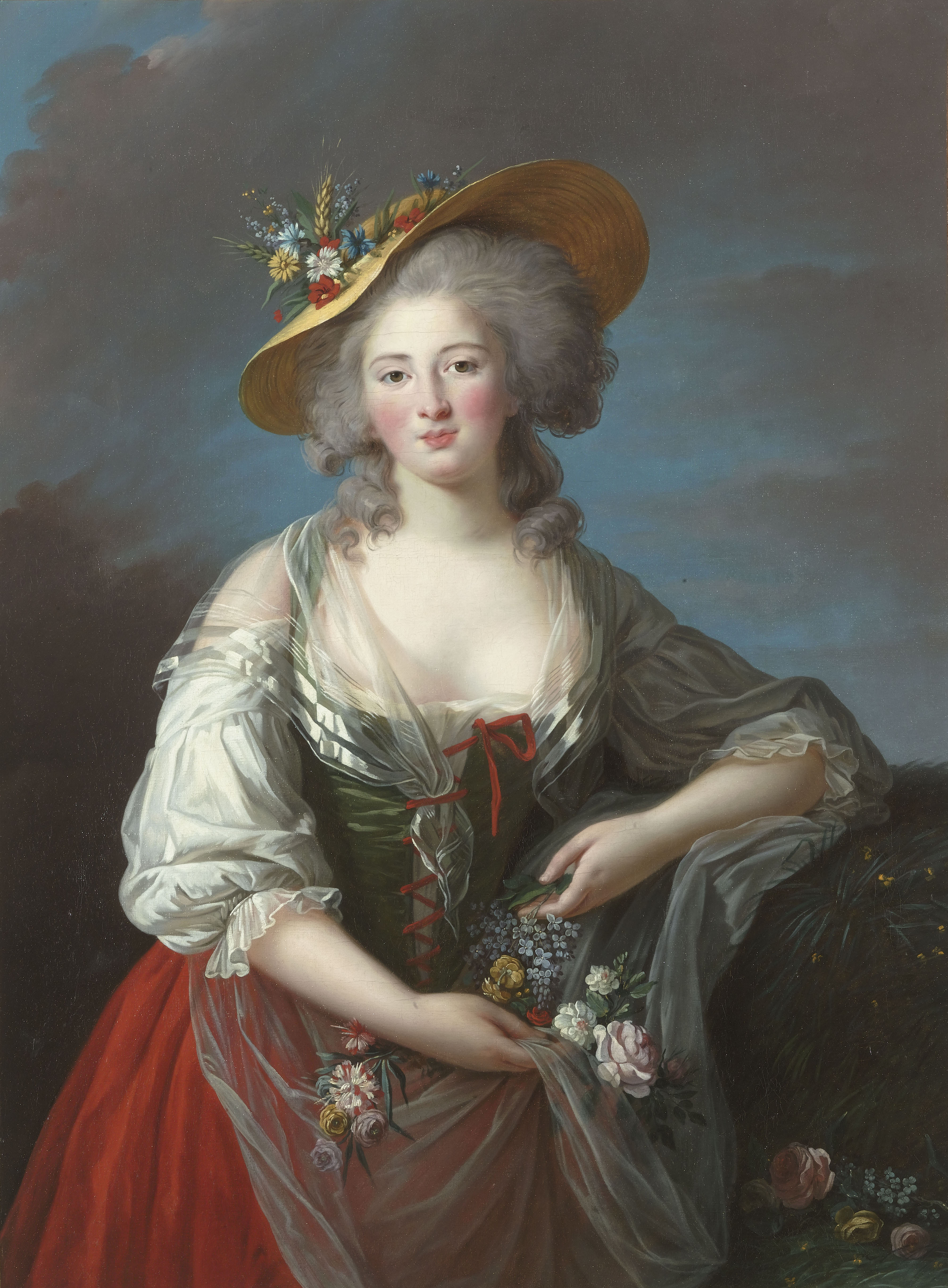
Madame Élisabeth

Thus in 1772, the Prince of Rohan-Guéméné and his wife, known as Madame de Guéméné acquired the domain of Montreuil, which they enlarge to form a property of 8 hectares. The transformations of both the house and the gardens were entrusted to the architect Alexandre Louis Étable de La Brière. In 1783, following the scandalous bankruptcy of the Guéméné, Louis XVI bought the house for his younger sister Elisabeth. The Queen presented it to her with the words: "My sister, you are now at home. This place will be your Trianon." Madame Élisabeth remained here until 1789.

From 1784 to 1789, the buildings were updated in the Neoclassical style by architect Jean-Jacques Huvé, future mayor of Versailles (1792-1793). He rebuilt the main building on two levels (ground floor and first floor) in stone, contributed a horizontal roof and repaired the broken attic. This renovation included a circular chapel with zenith lighting as well as a Turkish boudoir. The furniture was commissioned to cabinetmaker Jean-Baptiste-Claude Sené. Pieces of this furniture are preserved today at the Louvre Museum and at the Musée Nissim de Camondo.

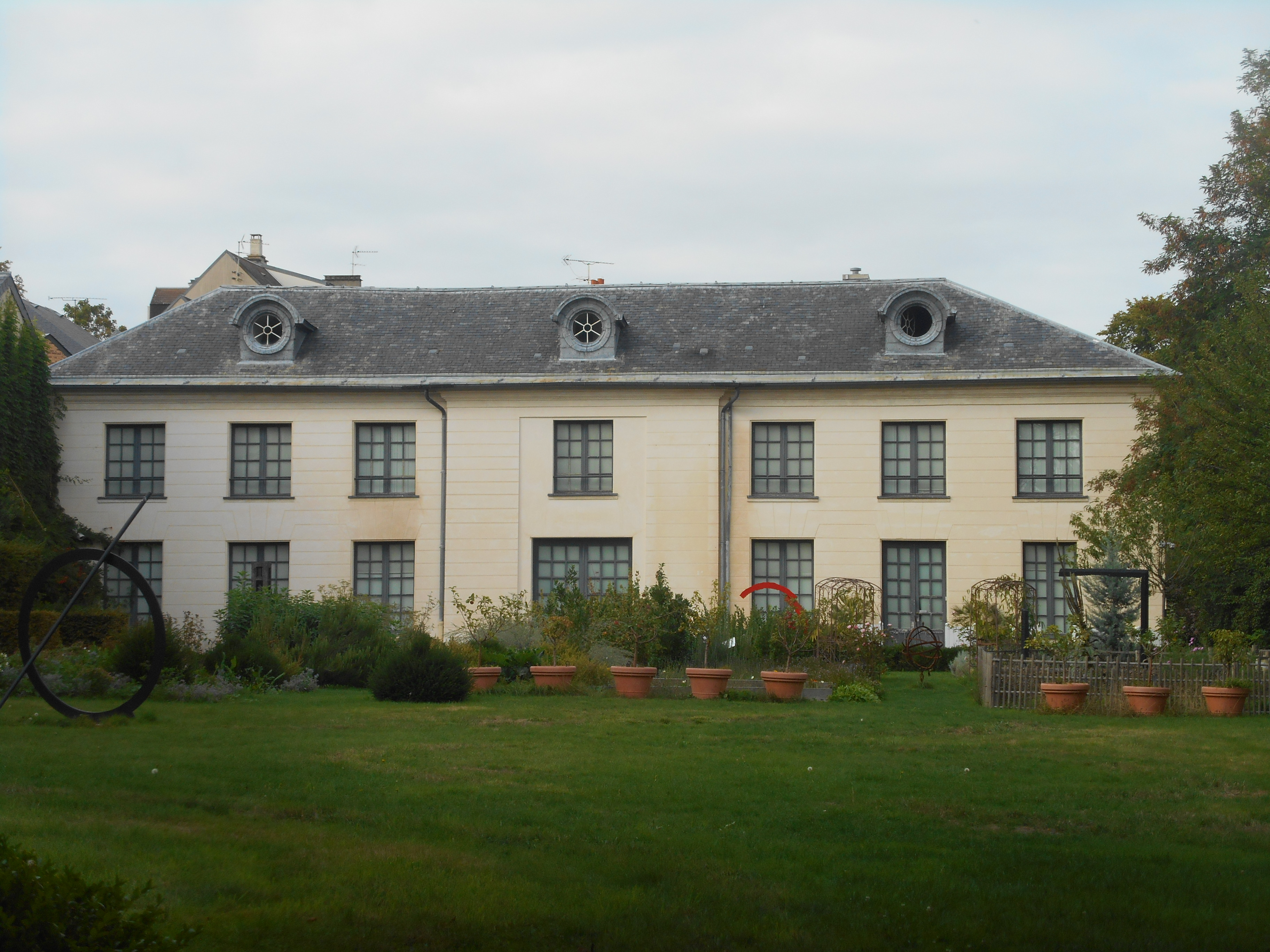
The Orangery

The closing wall, along the Avenue de Paris, crowned with a balustrade, served as a terrace from which one could admire the park and the eight-hectare garden landscaped by Huvé in what was called Anglo-Chinese style (fake cave, watercourse, waterfall, bridge, etc.). Drawings by the architect, preserved in the Bibliothèque nationale, the Carnavalet Museum and the Lambinet Museum, bear memory of this arrangement.

Madame Elisabeth established a small dispensary in a room of the house for the local poor. They were treated by the doctor and botanist Louis Guillaume Le Monnier, who brought rare plants to the garden of the estate. The Revolution put an end to these occupations.

Having escaped fragmentation of the properties during the French Revolution, the Clausse family became proprietors during the early nineteenth century. Charles Louis Clausse, mayor of Versailles died on September 10, 1831.

The buildings were heavily altered, undoubtedly under the Bourbon Restoration or July Monarchy, resulting in the configuration that we know today.

=== Modern era ===
During the 1920s, important restorations were carried out by the owner, Jean-Baptiste Chantrell. In 1955, his daughter Lydie sold the property to a real estate company. The house of Madame Élisabeth belongs since 1984 to the General Council of Yvelines. The Orangery, acquired by the department in 1997, serves as a venue for temporary exhibitions.

== Description ==
The current dwelling consists of a rectangular two-floor main building flanked by two pavilions. The facade is decorated with a peristyle with four columns. From the original design, only the part initially acquired by the Guéméné and three rooms of the apartments of Madame Élisabeth remain: the room that was to be hers but where she never slept, the Turkish salon, and the harpsichord room. Some decorations have been restored.

In addition to the Orangery, the estate was bordered by a dairy farm and cowshed that are now lost.

The orangery has been registered as a historic monument since 23 October 1980.

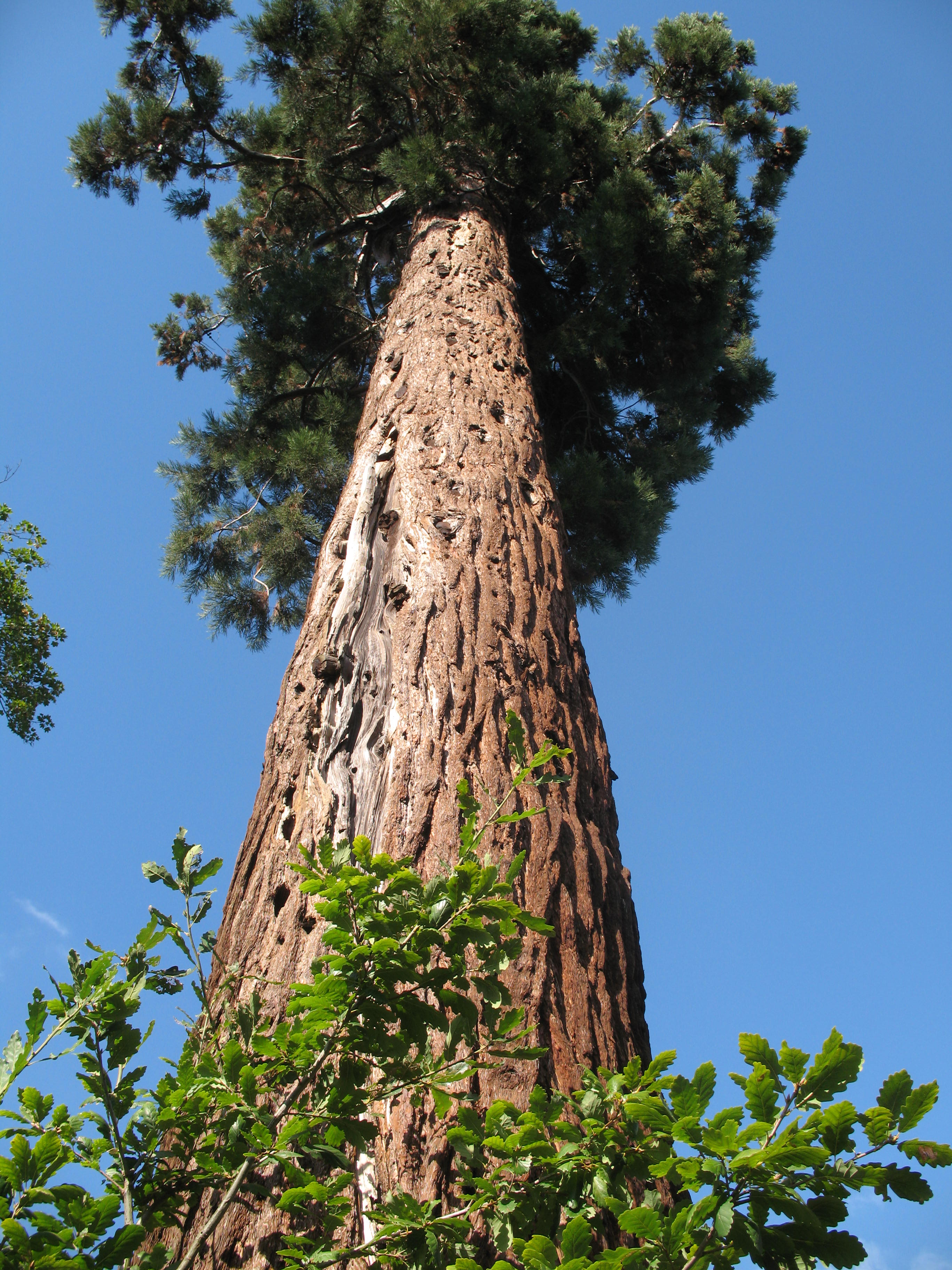
Sequoia tree

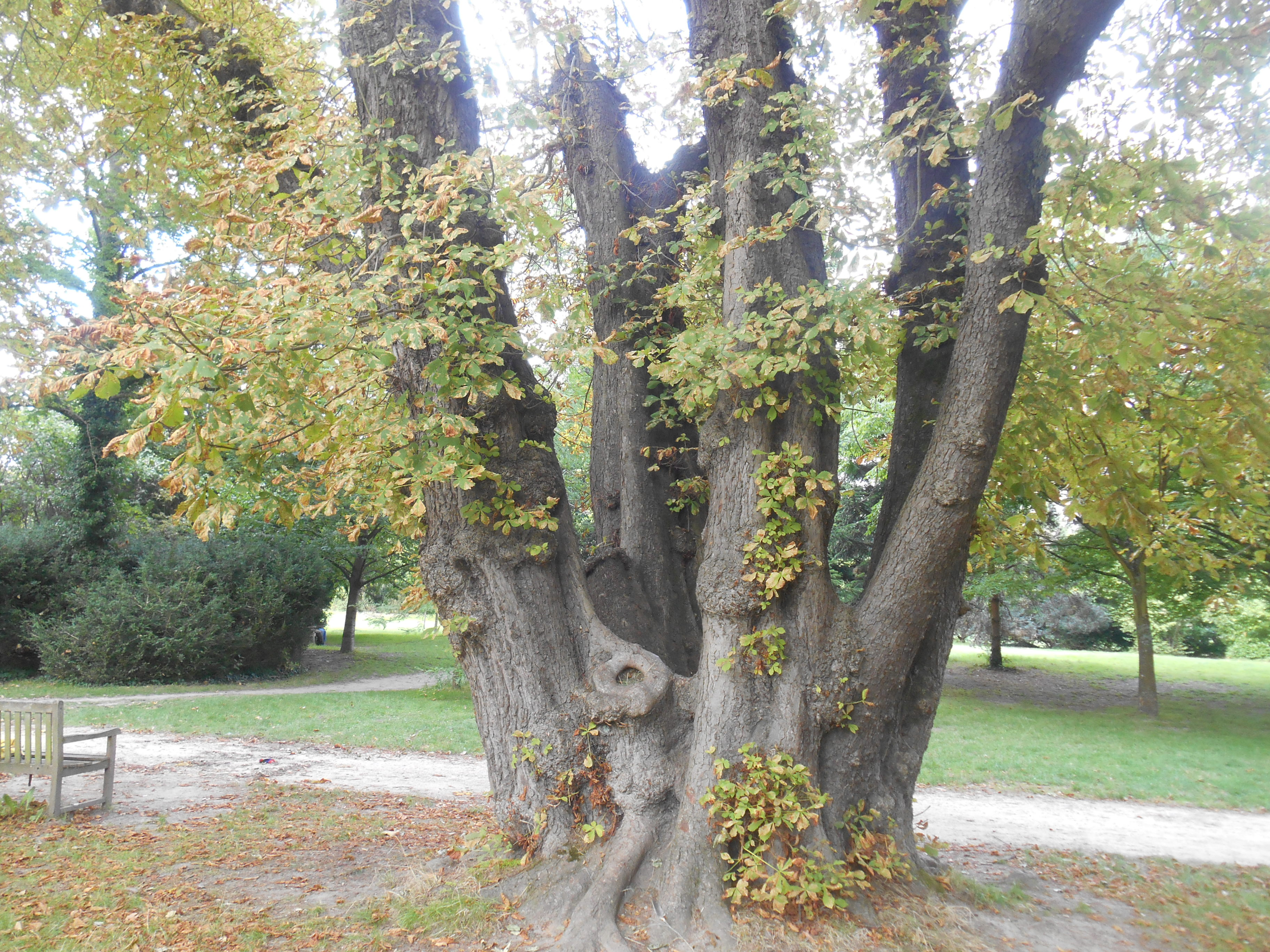
Chestnut tree

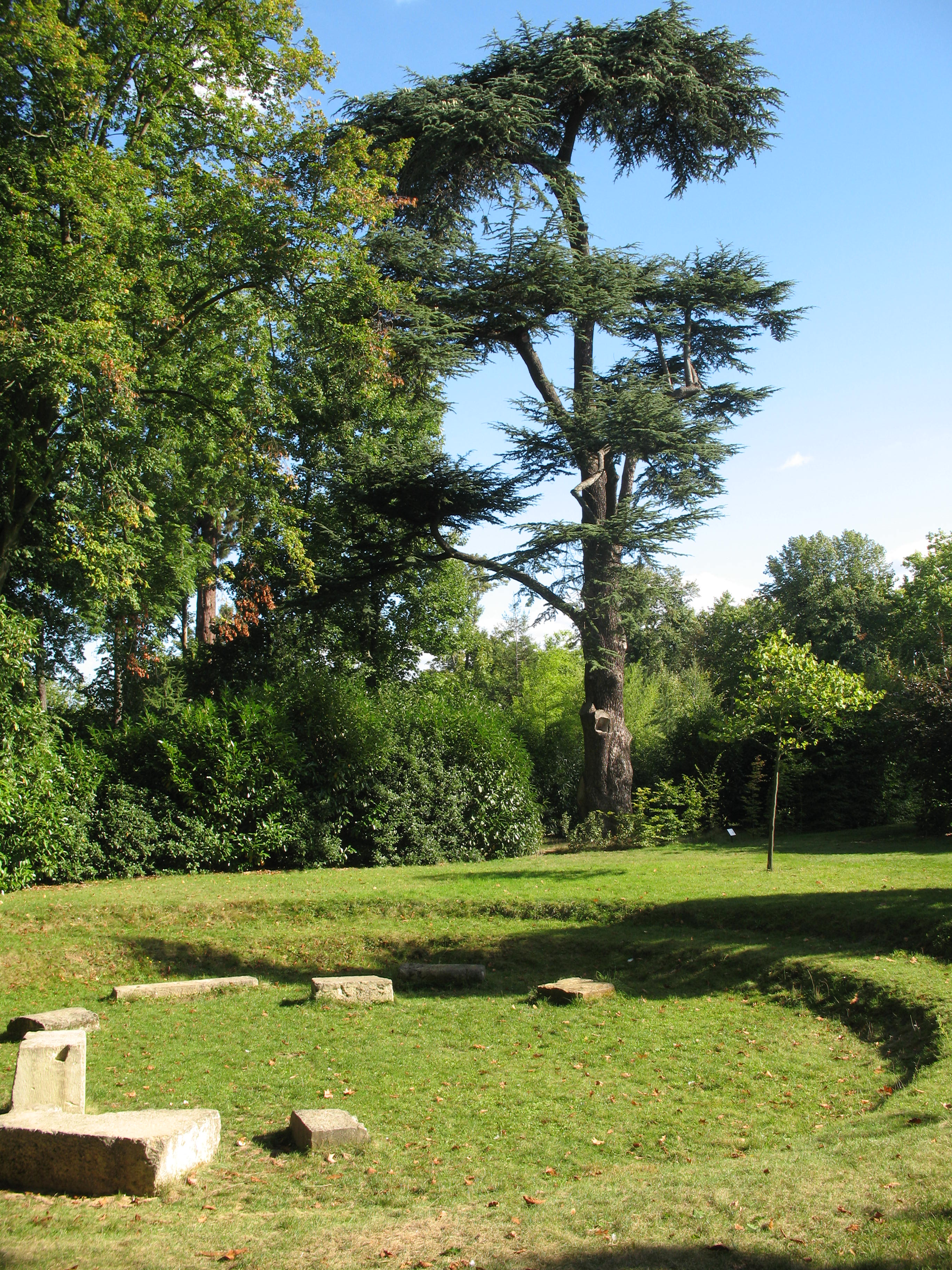

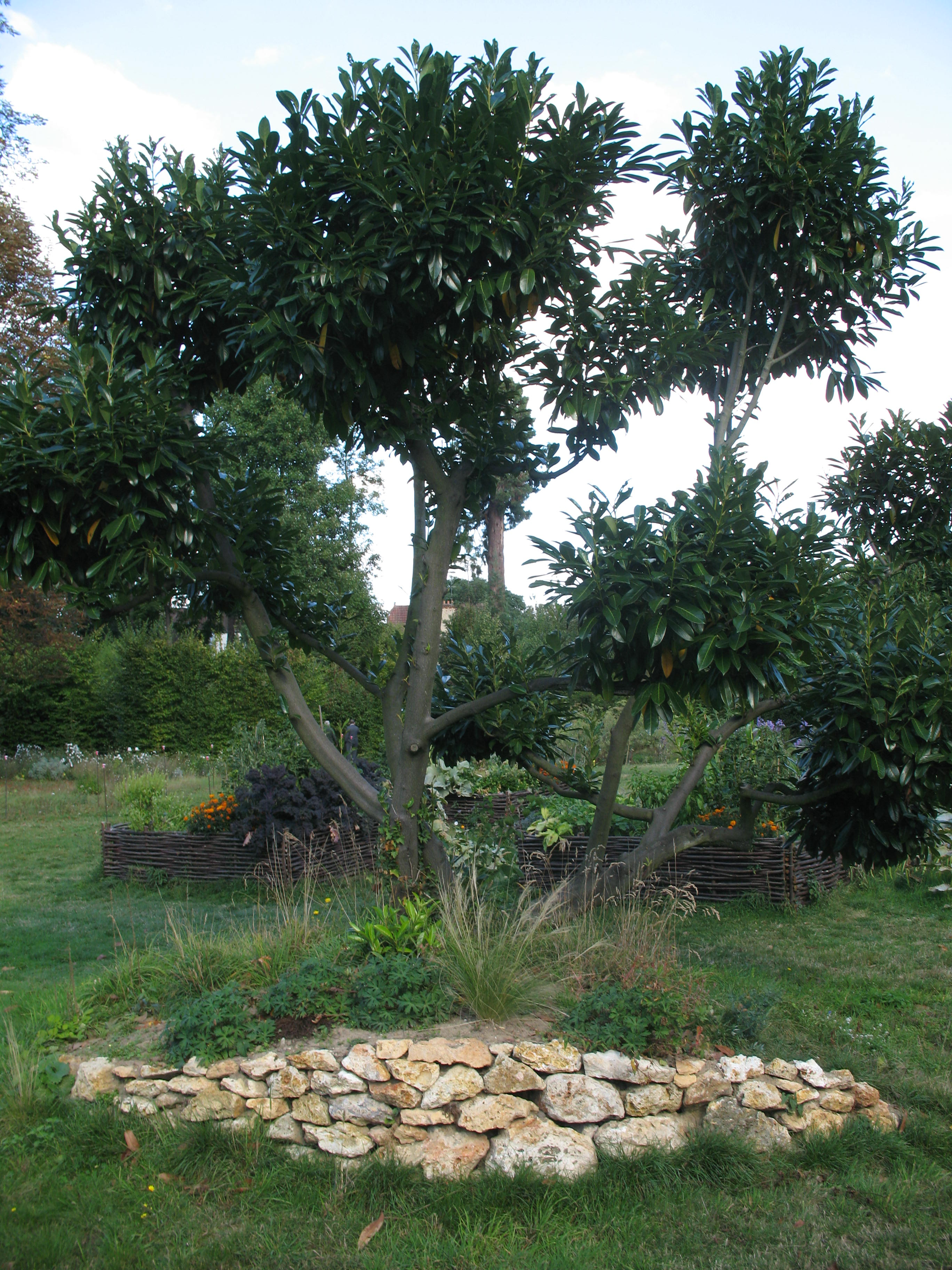

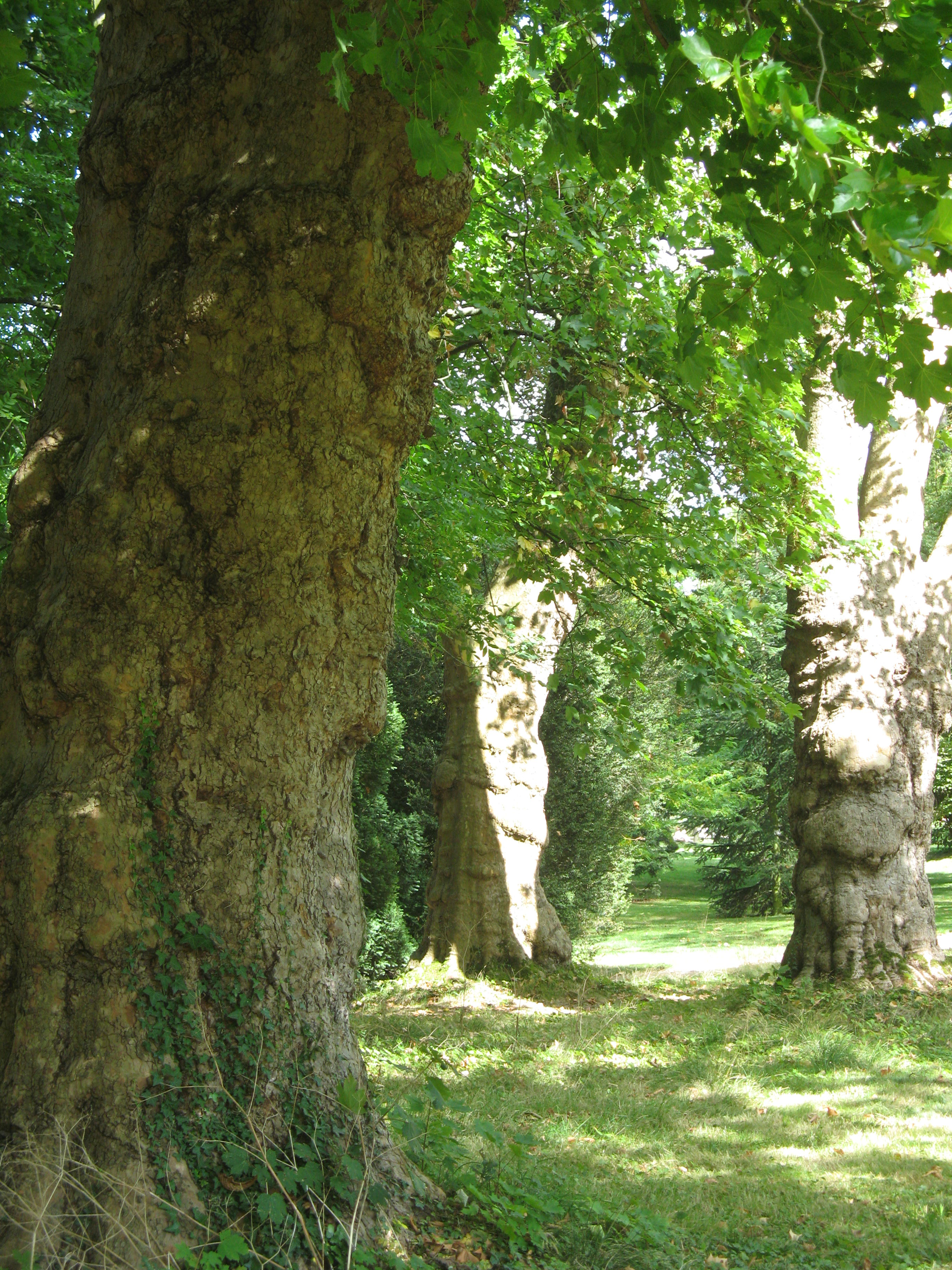

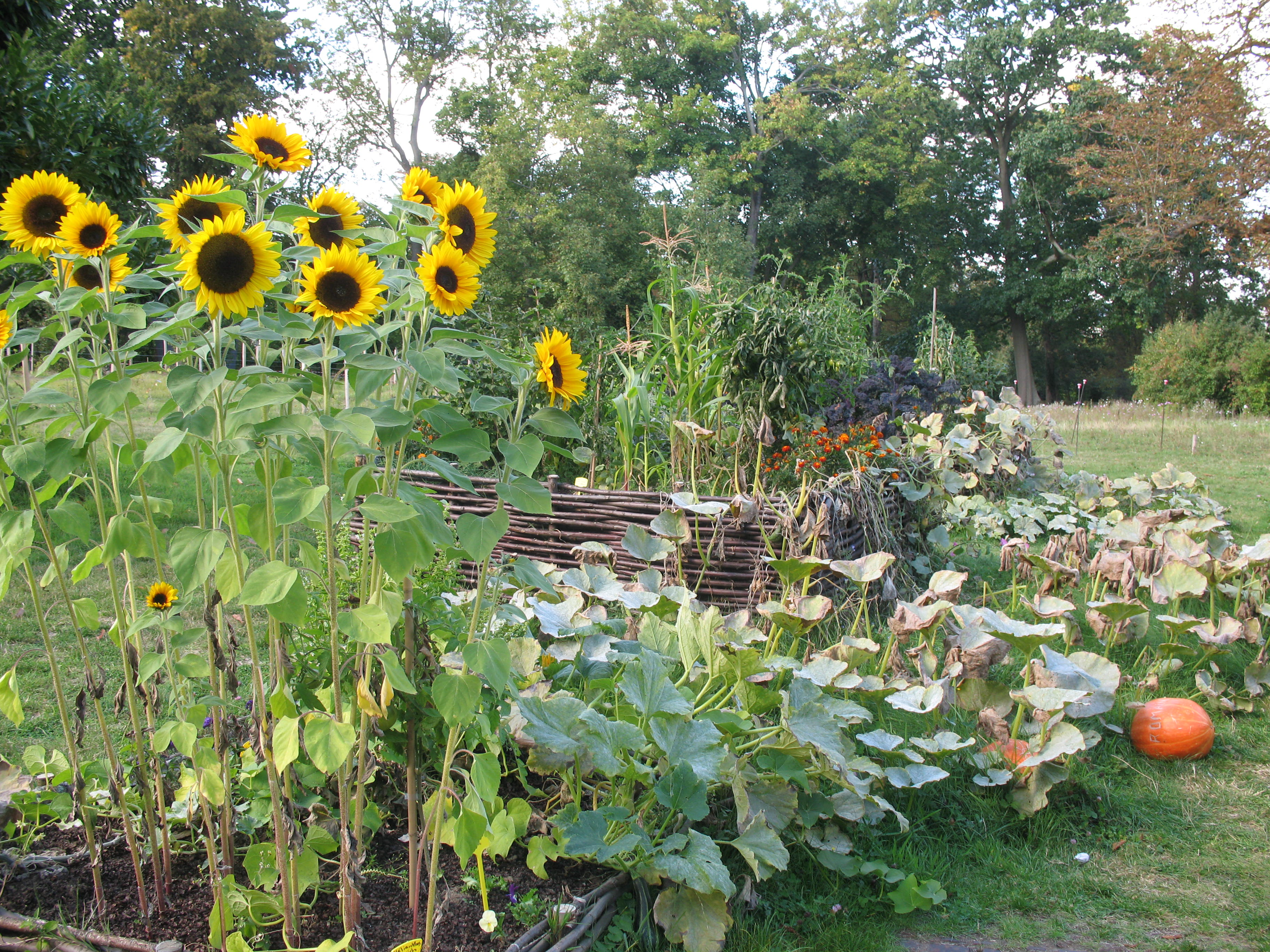

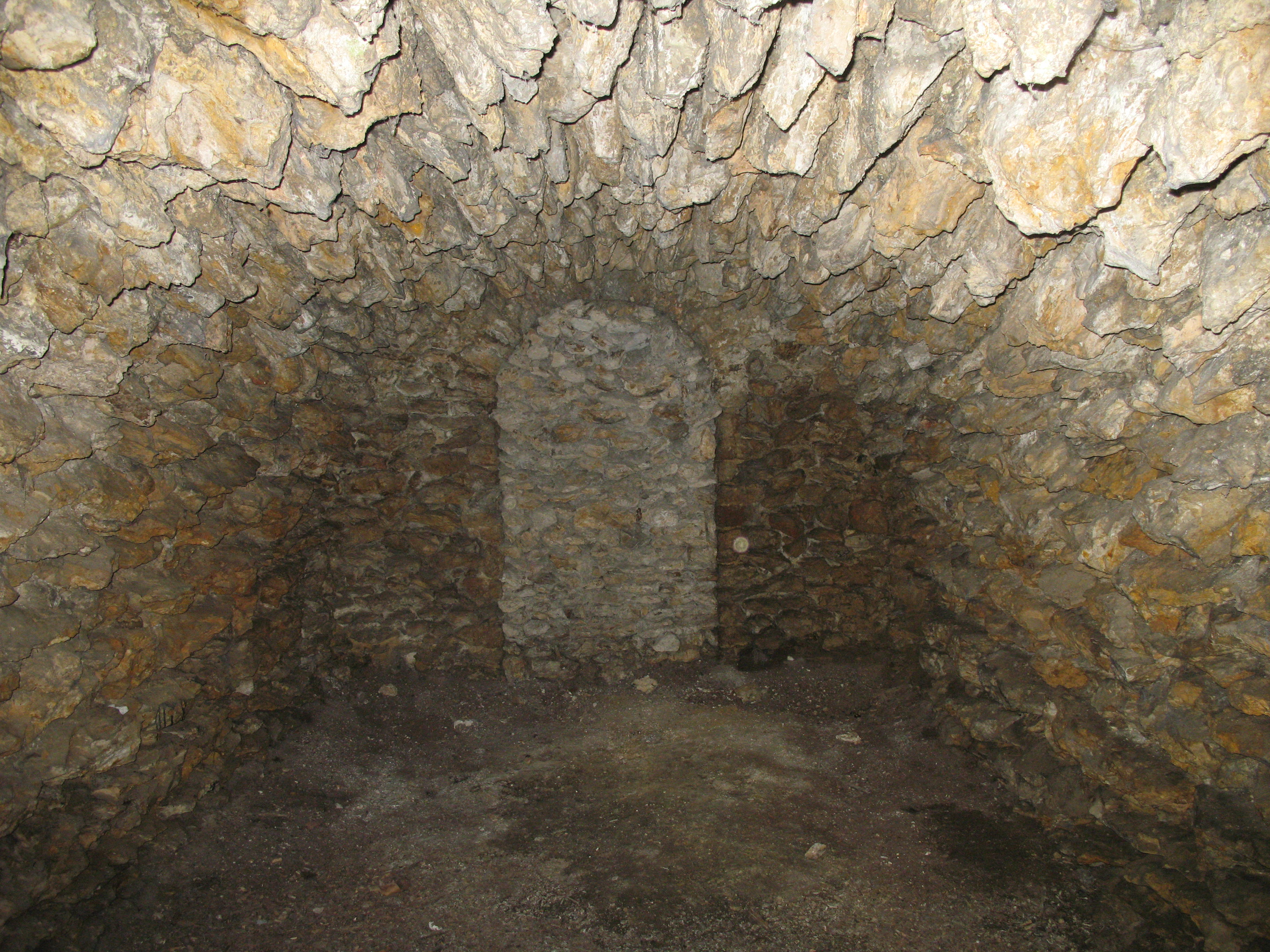
False cave
