= Munderic =

Munderic (died 532/33) was a Merovingian claimant to the Frankish throne. He was a wealthy nobleman and landowner with vast estates in the region around Vitry-le-Brûle (now Vitry-en-Perthois) near Châlons-sur-Marne.

In 532 or 533 or around that year he put forth a claim to royal descent as being or claiming to be a son of Chlodoric the Parricide and asked for a share of the kingdom of Austrasia from Theuderic I. He had a band of sworn followers. Theuderic attempted to summon him to court in order to kill him, but after Munderic refused, a force was sent against him. The pretender took refuge with his loyal supporters in Vitry. The Austrasian army, however, lacked siege engines and were unable to invest the place. Theuderic responded by sending a personal courtier of his, Arigisel, to negotiate for the rebels to come out, which they did. The dishonest ambassador had them cut down immediately.

According to Christian Settipani, Munderic married Arthemia, the granddaughter of Rusticus, archbishop of Lyon, and they were the parents of the wife of the Frankish nobleman, Mummolin, although others have referred to him as Munderic's son.

== Sources ==
- Bachrach, Bernard S. Merovingian Military Organization, 481–751. Minneapolis: University of Minnesota Press, 1971.
