= Collegiate Church of Saint George and Saint Ode =

Church building in Amay, Belgium

Coordinates: 50°32′55″N 5°19′03″E

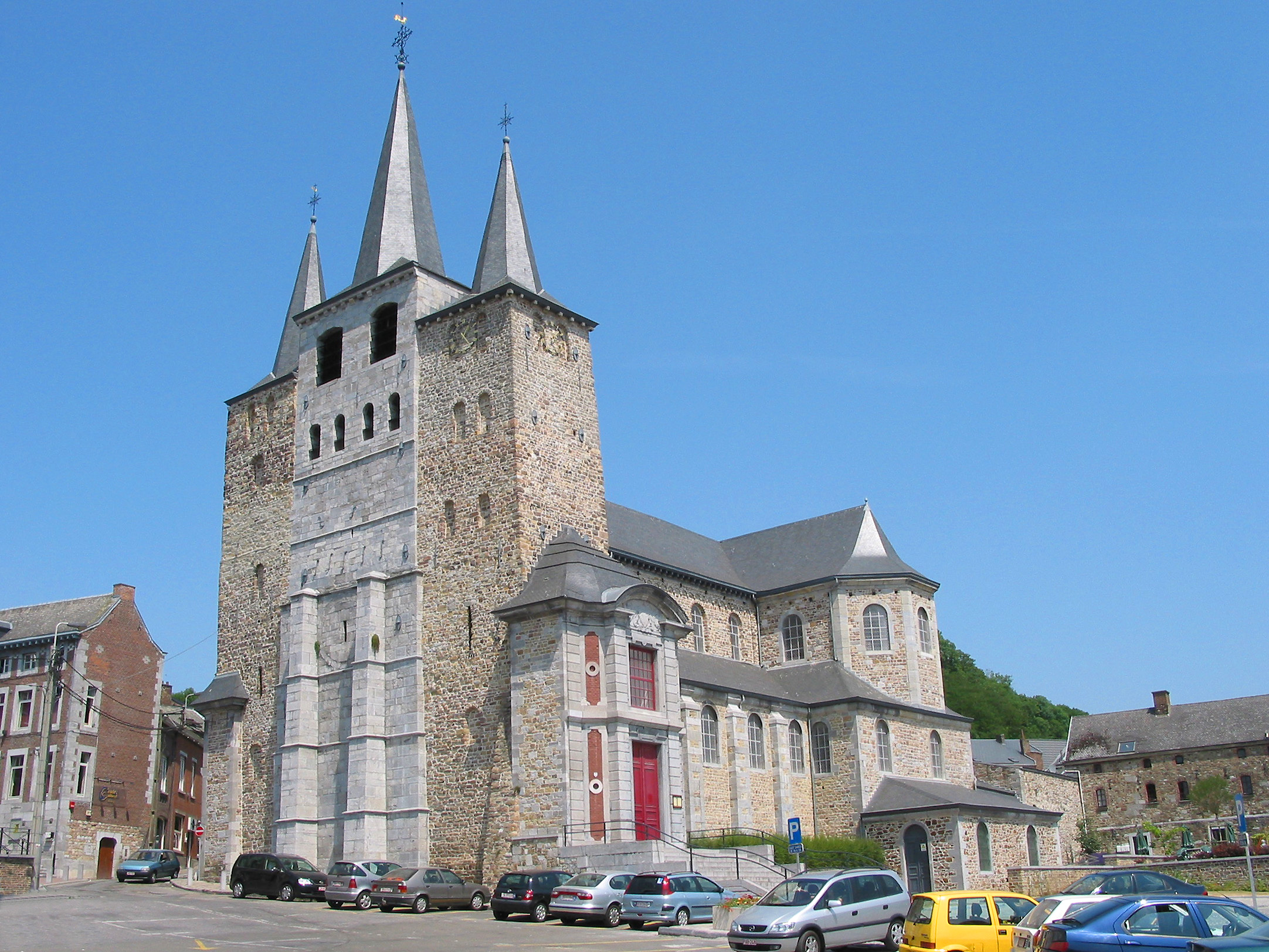
The Collegiate Church of Saint George and Saint Ode, exterior view from the south-west

The Collegiate Church of Saint George and Saint Ode (French: Collégiale Saint-Georges et Sainte-Ode) is a former collegiate church and today the Catholic parish church of Amay, Belgium. Founded as a church, probably with a resident religious community, during the 6th century, the church became a collegiate church in the early 10th century. Saint Ode is considered the founder of the church; a decorated tombstone from the 8th century discovered in 1977 may have been that of the saint herself. Sometime between the late 11th century and the mid-12th century the church was substantially rebuilt; only the Romanesque western part of the church remains from this period. During the 18th century the church was heavily modified through a series of reconstruction projects. The church contains several historical furnishings, including a reliquary for relics of Saint George and Saint Ode from the middle of the 13th century, an elaborate example of Mosan art.

== History ==
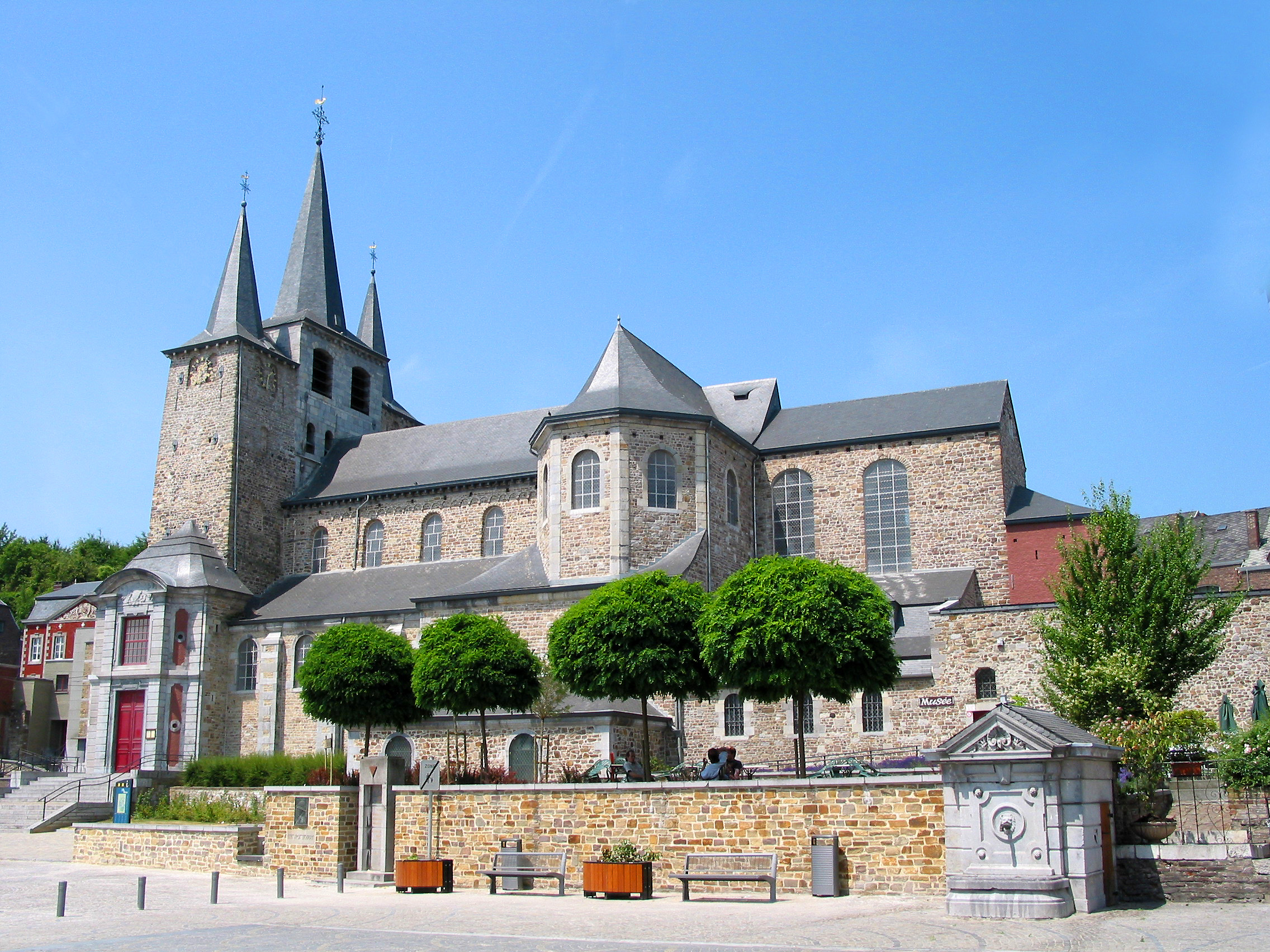
View of the church from the main square of Amay (south-east)

The church traces its origins to a sanctuary founded during the Merovingian era, at some point towards the end of the 6th century. This first Christian church was constructed on top of the remains of a Roman building. Saint Ode is considered the founder of the church, which was originally referred to as a "basilica". A document dated 634 indicates that there was a religious community tied to the church, perhaps of nuns, though it became organised as a collegiate church in the early 10th century. A large donation was made to the church sometime between the late 11th century and the mid-12th century (either by Henry of Verdun or Henry II of Leez; the medieval sources are unclear as to which Henry was the donor) that supposedly financed a significant reconstruction effort. The oldest, and only significant part of the medieval church still remaining, is the westwork. Somewhat later but still from the Romanesque era are the lower walls of the nave of the church. The westwork of the church was rebuilt during the 16th century: originally, the central part was lower and only the side towers were towers in a strict sense. The current spires date from the 17th century, and the buttresses supporting the main tower were not added until 1830.

The church was thoroughly remodelled during the 18th century. First, the chancel and nave were rebuilt in 1720–1725, then in 1765 a new roof was constructed, and in 1772–1774 the interior was heavily changed, two side entrances, a chapter house, and two side chapels added. Despite these interventions, the church largely retains the shape and proportions it acquired during the Romanesque time period.

Today, the church functions as a parish church and no longer as a collegiate church, but is still called by its historical name.

== Description ==
Tombstone of Chrodoara, presumed identical with Saint Ode, from the 8th century and discovered in 1977.

Reliquary of Saint Ode and Saint George preserved in the church (13th century).

The building material of the church is largely fieldstone and dressed stone, with small additions of brick. The roofs are made of slate. The church is accessed through one of the western porches added during the 18th century, facing south and the main square of Amay. The interior consists of a nave and two aisles, five bays long, a transept and a two-bay chancel. The ceiling is stuccoed and vaulted, decorated in an 18th-century Classical style. The apse is square. The former chapter house and cloister are preserved to the east of the church, and the church has two sacristies to the north and south of the chancel.

The church contains an 8th-century tombstone inscribed with the name Chrodoara, discovered during archaeological excavations in 1977. The tomb was almost empty when discovered, the relics probably transferred to a reliquary sometime during the Middle Ages. Although it cannot be proven, the majority view among researchers is that Chrodoara is identical with Saint Ode, the traditionally attributed founder of the church in the 6th century. The tombstone is unusual also for its decoration: it is the only known tombstone of this type and from this time to depict the deceased. It may have been commissioned by the Bishop of Maastricht in connection with the canonisation of Chrodoara. It is classified as an exceptional heritage object (French: bien exceptionnel) by the French Community of Belgium.

The church also contains a reliquary made for relics of both Saint George and Saint Ode, also classified as an exceptional heritage object. The elaborately decorated chest is decorated with images of Saint George, on horseback, and Saint Ode, dressed as a nun, on the sides. The top displays scenes from the lives of the two saints. The front and back are decorated with figures of seated apostles, separated by twin columns supporting arcades. It dates from the mid-13th century and is Gothic in style, but still displaying some Romanesque features. It may have been presented to the church by the Prince-Bishop of Liège, Hugues de Pierrepont. It is considered a highlight of Mosan art and one of only around fifteen such reliquaries preserved from the Meuse region from the Middle Ages. The reliquary is not normally displayed in the church.

In addition, the church holds several other historical furnishings. The rood screen is Baroque in style, and dates from the 17th century. The altarpieces date from the 17th and 18th centuries, and most of the other furnishings range from the 17th to 19th century. There is also a painting attributed to Englebert Fisen displayed in the church. There is a museum adjacent to the church, housed in the former cloister, that is dedicated to the archaeology and history of the church and the area.

== Sources cited ==
- Barral i Altet, Xavier (1989). Belgique Romane (in French). Zodiaque. ISBN 2-7369-0166-5.
- Leclercq-Marx, Jacqueline (1997). L'art Roman en Belgique (in French). Braine-l'Alleud: J.-M. Collet. OCLC 40595503.
- Menne, Gilbert, ed. (2014). Le grand guide de Wallonie et de Bruxelles (in French). Brussels: Racine. ISBN 978-94-014-1418-0.
