= Mummolin of Soissons =

6th-century Frankish nobleman

Mummolin (Latin: Mummolinus) (born c. 500) was a Frankish nobleman.

== Life ==
He was a son or son-in-law of Munderic. He served as Mayor of the Palace of Neustria.

== Issue ==
He fathered:

1. Bodegisel (murdered 585 or 588), married to Chrodoare of Amay. Some researchers claim that they were the parents of Saint Arnulf of Metz, but proof is lacking.
2. Babon, Duke, married and father of:
  1. Ermengunde
  2. Adon
  3. ..., parent of:
    1. Bobo, Duke between 634 and 641
  4. Adalgisel Grimo (died after 634)
