= Jacques Drevet =

French architect

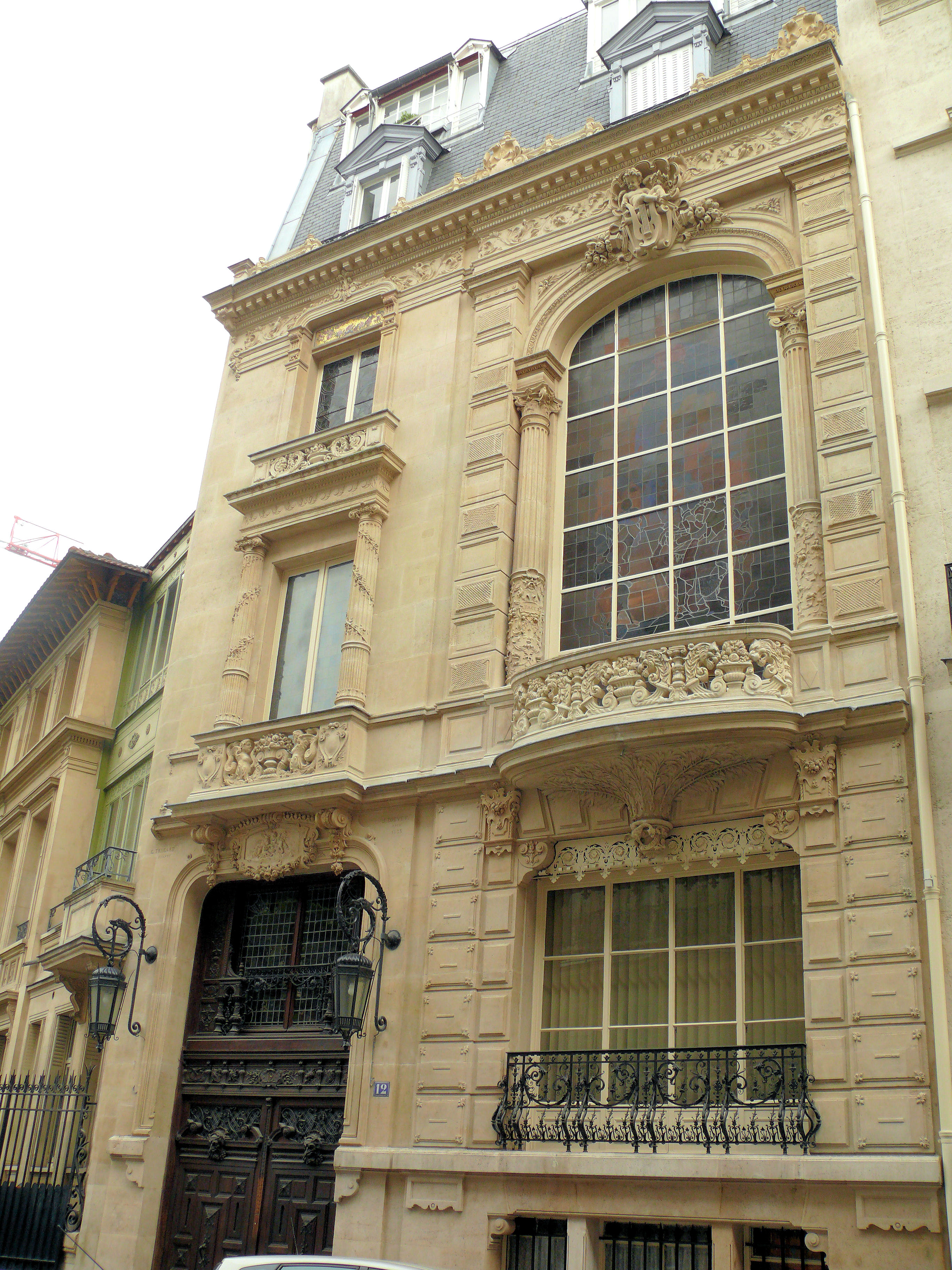
The Hôtel Judic

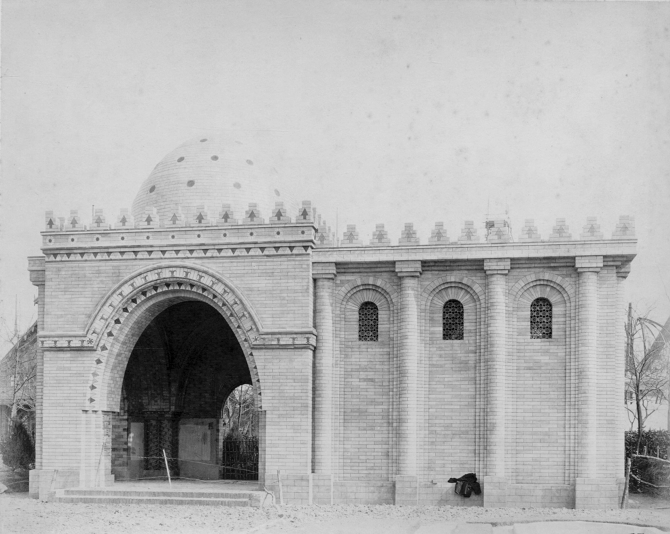
The Iranian Pavilion at the Exposition Universelle (1889)

Jacques Drevet (3 May 1832, Villefranche-sur-Saône – 11 May 1900, La Baule-Escoublac) was a French architect; primarily known for works in an Orientalist style.

== Life and work ==
As an architect employed by Isma'il Pasha, the Khedive of Egypt, he helped build the docks at Alexandria. He also assisted with the construction of the buildings for the Egyptian pavilion at the Exposition Universelle (1867), under the direction of the Egyptologist, François Auguste Ferdinand Mariette. Later, he recovered parts of the pavilion for use in a Moorish-style villa in Orsay, belonging to the sculptor, Charles Cordier. In 1868, he was named a Knight in the Legion of Honor. The following year, he was part of the entourage that accompanied the Empress Eugénie to the inauguration of the Suez Canal.

Between 1874 and 1886, he was periodically involved with work on two mansions belonging to the artist, Claudius Popelin, in Paris. In 1876, he built four Moorish-style pavilions at the Villa Masquelier, in Sainte-Adresse, and the headquarters of Crédit havrais, in Le Havre. From 1883 to 1884 he built a mansion, now known as the Hôtel Judic, for the comic actress, Anna Judic. In 1990, it was designated a Monument historique.

In 1894, he entered a competition to design the new Egyptian Museum in Cairo, but a design by Marcel Dourgnon was selected. Around 1897, he designed the annex to the post-office in La Baule-Escoublac, but it was demolished in the early 1960s, to make room for a new luxury apartment building. The adjoining street has since been named after him.

He was married to Jeanne Lenormand; daughter of the architect Louis Lenormand. Their daughter, Geneviève, was married to André Pavie, the Mayor of La Baule-Escoublac from 1917 to 1925.
