= Jacques-Marie Huvé =

French architect (1783-1852)

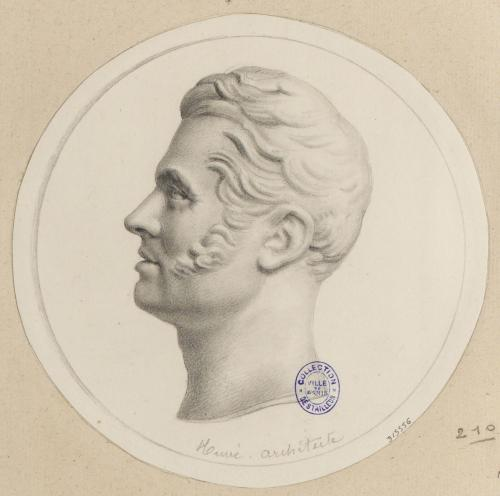
Jacques-Marie Huvé (artist unknown)

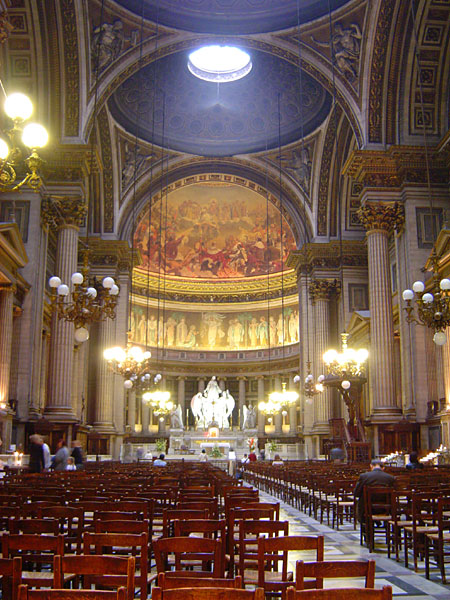
Interior, Église de la Madeleine

Jean-Jacques-Marie Huvé (French pronunciation: [ʒɑ̃ ʒak maʁi yve]; 28 April 1783, Versailles – 23 November 1852, Paris) was a French architect who practiced in Paris, working in a neoclassical manner that he refined working in the atelier of Percier and Fontaine, Napoleon's chief architects.

== Biography ==
He was the son of the architect, Jean-Jacques Huvé, from whom he received his earliest instruction. He was named supervisor of the works at the Église de la Madeleine in 1808, and at the decease of its architect, Pierre-Alexandre Vignon, in 1828, he was called upon to bring the work to completion. His tenacity finally pressed the government to release the funding that permitted the church to be completed in 1842.

He was appointed architect of the Royal Mails, was admitted a member of the Académie des Beaux-Arts (the Institut de France's architecture, music, and fine arts section) and served as president of the Société des Beaux-Arts.

As a teacher, he trained renowned architect Eugène Viollet-le-Duc in his studio. At the École des Beaux-Arts, his notable students included Gustave Guérin and Charles Laisné.

His only son, Félix Huvé (1816-1887), was Mayor of Sablé-sur-Sarthe.

== Principal works ==
- Église de la Madeleine, Paris, which he finished 1828-42
- Château de Saint-Ouen, built on behalf of Louis XVIII for Zoé Talon, comtesse du Cayla, 1821-1822.
- Château de Compiègne
- Salle Ventadour, 1826–1829

== Sources ==
- Bruno Centorame (Ed.), Autour de la Madeleine: art, littérature et société, Paris, AAVP, 2005. ISBN 978-2-913246-53-9
- Louis Hautecoeur, Histoire de l'architecture classique en France, Paris, Picard, 1943-1957.
- François Loyer, Histoire de l'architecture française. T. 3, De la Révolution à nos jours, Paris, Mengès-CNMHS, 1999. ISBN 978-2-85620-395-8
