= Jean-Jacques Huvé =

French architect (1742-1808)

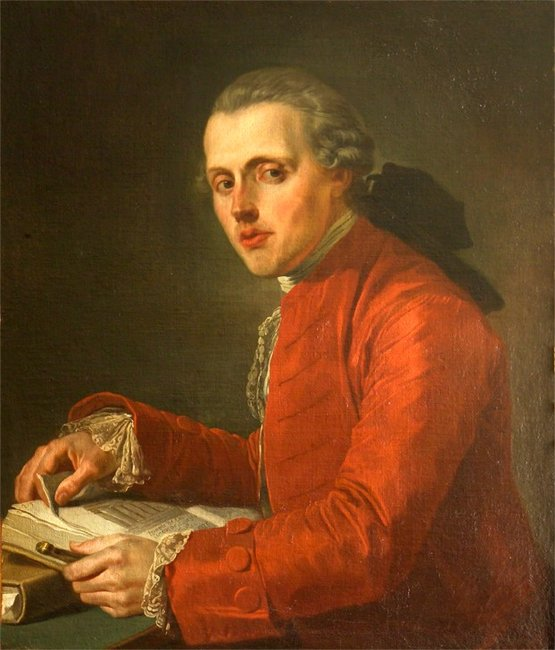
Jean-Jacques Huvé; by Joseph-Benoît Suvée (c.1775)

Jean-Jacques Huvé (French pronunciation: [ʒɑ̃ ʒak yve]; 22 June 1742, Boinvilliers - 24 May 1808, Versailles) was a French architect in the Palladian style.

== Biography ==
He was the first of nine children born to Jean Huvé (1707-1785), a clerk for the tax-farmer, Charles Savalette, and his wife, Catherine née Delaire (1714-1786). He began his career under the sponsorship of the Savalettes, who employed him at their Château de Magnanville and encouraged his studies at an architectural school operated by Jacques-François Blondel. In 1762, he became an apprentice, and worked on several building projects; notably with Nicolas Lenoir, reconstructing Cîteaux Abbey. From 1765 to 1766, he assisted his teacher, Blondel, with urban planning for Metz and Strasbourg.

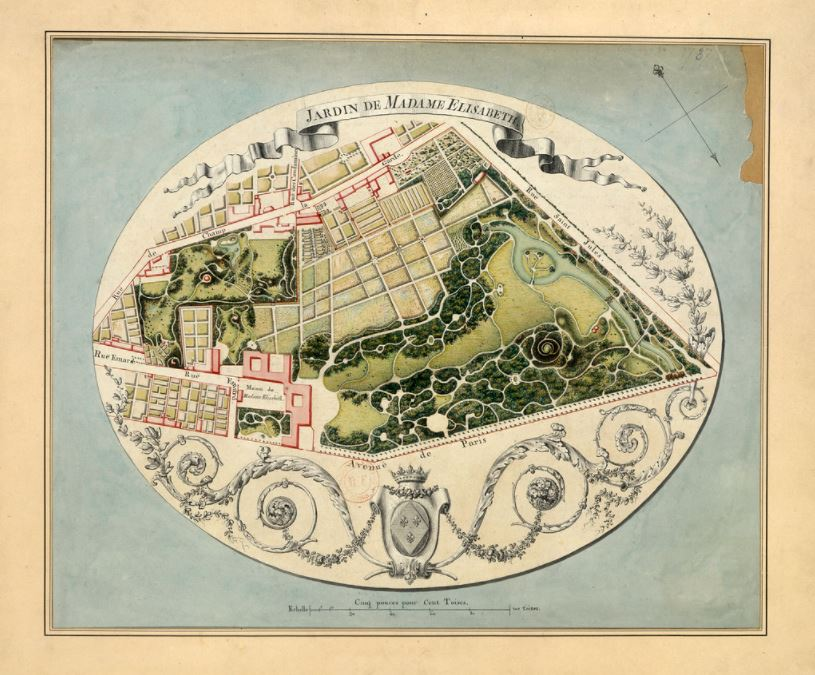
Plan for the garden at the Domaine of Madame Élisabeth in Montreuil (1788)

In 1770, he won the Prix de Rome with his plans for an arsenal, but his departure for Italy was delayed by an internal dispute at the Académie. In the meantime, he occupied himself as an inspector of works at the Paris Mint, under the direction of Jacques Denis Antoine. In 1774, he was finally able to go to Rome. He made a lengthy stay in Languedoc en route, and worked on several projects there. During his travels, he kept an illustrated diary. While in Italy, he built an aqueduct in Catania, for Ignazio Paternò Castello, the Prince of Biscari.

Returning to France, he once again benefitted from the support of the Savalettes, and their successors at Magnanville, the Taverniers. From 1776 to 1780, he built two adjoining mansions in Yvelines and, from 1780 to 1785, a stone castle in Hornoy-le-Bourg. Later, he built a chapel and vestibule at the Château de Montmirail. Finally, he was able to build a home for himself and his wife, in Meudon; a small folie in Louis XVI style

His wife, who he married in 1780, was Antoinette Pucelle (1749-1829), the daughter of Pierre Vincent Pucelle (1720-1793), an advisor to the Parlement of Paris. They had a daughter and three sons, including Jacques-Marie Huvé, who also became an architect.

Thanks to a recommendation from Cardinal de Bernis, in 1777 he was named Inspector for the Bâtiments du roi, and served in that capacity until the Revolution. His duties included caring for the King's stables, kennels and "Potager du Roi" (kitchen garden) at Versailles Palace. He also rebuilt the hunting lodge, and redesigned the interior of the chapel, which was later destroyed. In 1783, he began working as an official architect for the King's sister, Madame Élisabeth, at Domaine de Montreuil. There, he built a circular chapel and developed an Anglo-Chinese garden.

After the Revolution, he devoted himself to administrative functions. In 1792, he was elected Mayor of Versailles, but was deposed during the Reign of Terror. He was still entrusted with minor matters, such as transforming the Grand Commun into an arms factory, and finding the missing jewels of Madame du Barry. Condemned to death in 1794, he escaped execution due to the fall of Robespierre. Returning to his municipal functions, he was chosen to be the administrator for Versailles Palace, which was being made into a museum. Later, he exhibited his views of Italy at the Salon and, in 1800, entered a competition to design a monumental column for the Place de la Concorde.

By 1801, his official functions had all been abolished. After making an attempt to obtain an administrative position at the consulate, he resigned himself to retirement. Over the next three years, he published more than twenty articles in architectural journals, then wrote his memoirs.

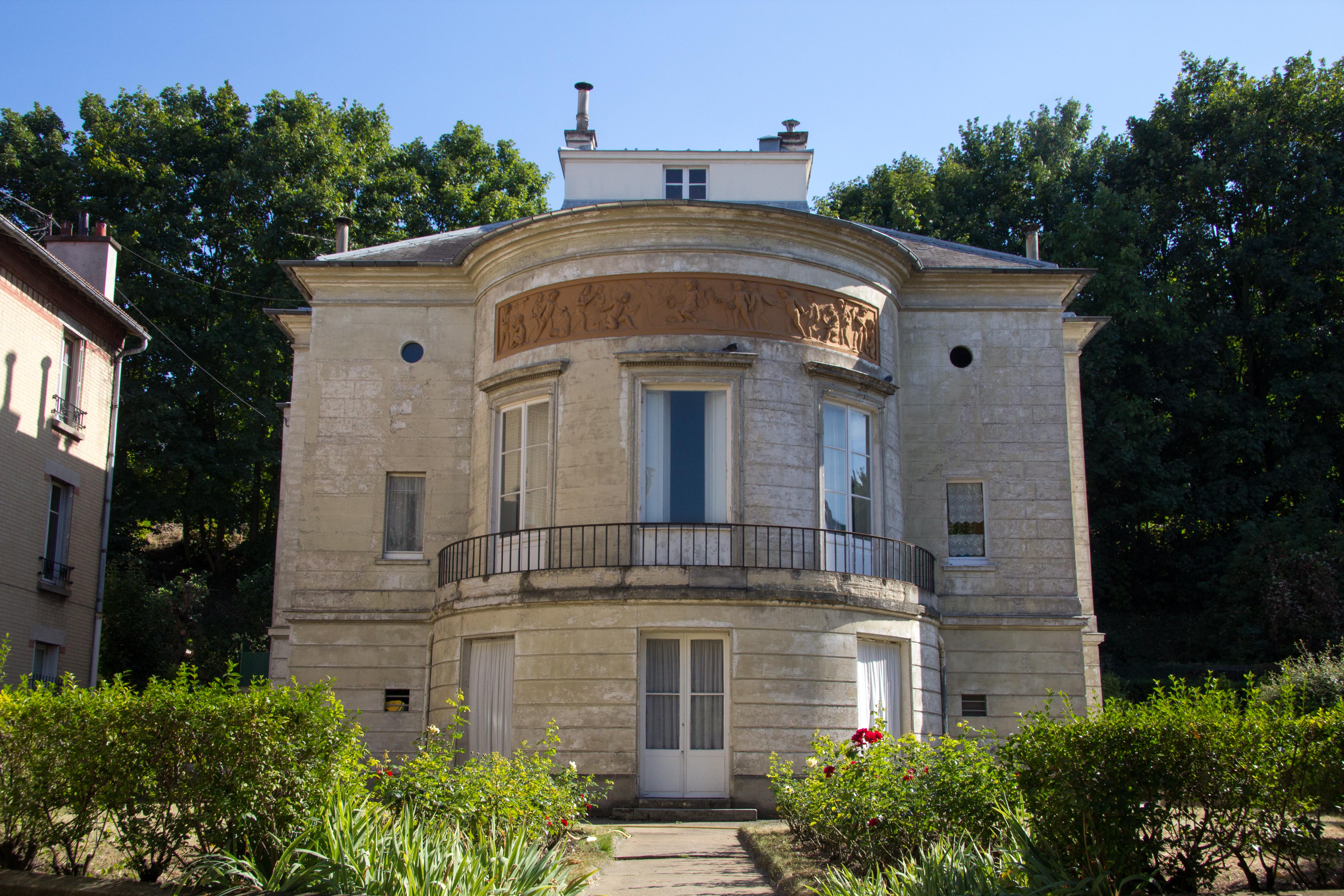
The Folie Huvé in Meudon
