= Saint-Martin Church of Clamecy =

Coordinates: 47°27′36″N 3°31′09″E

Saint-Martin Church
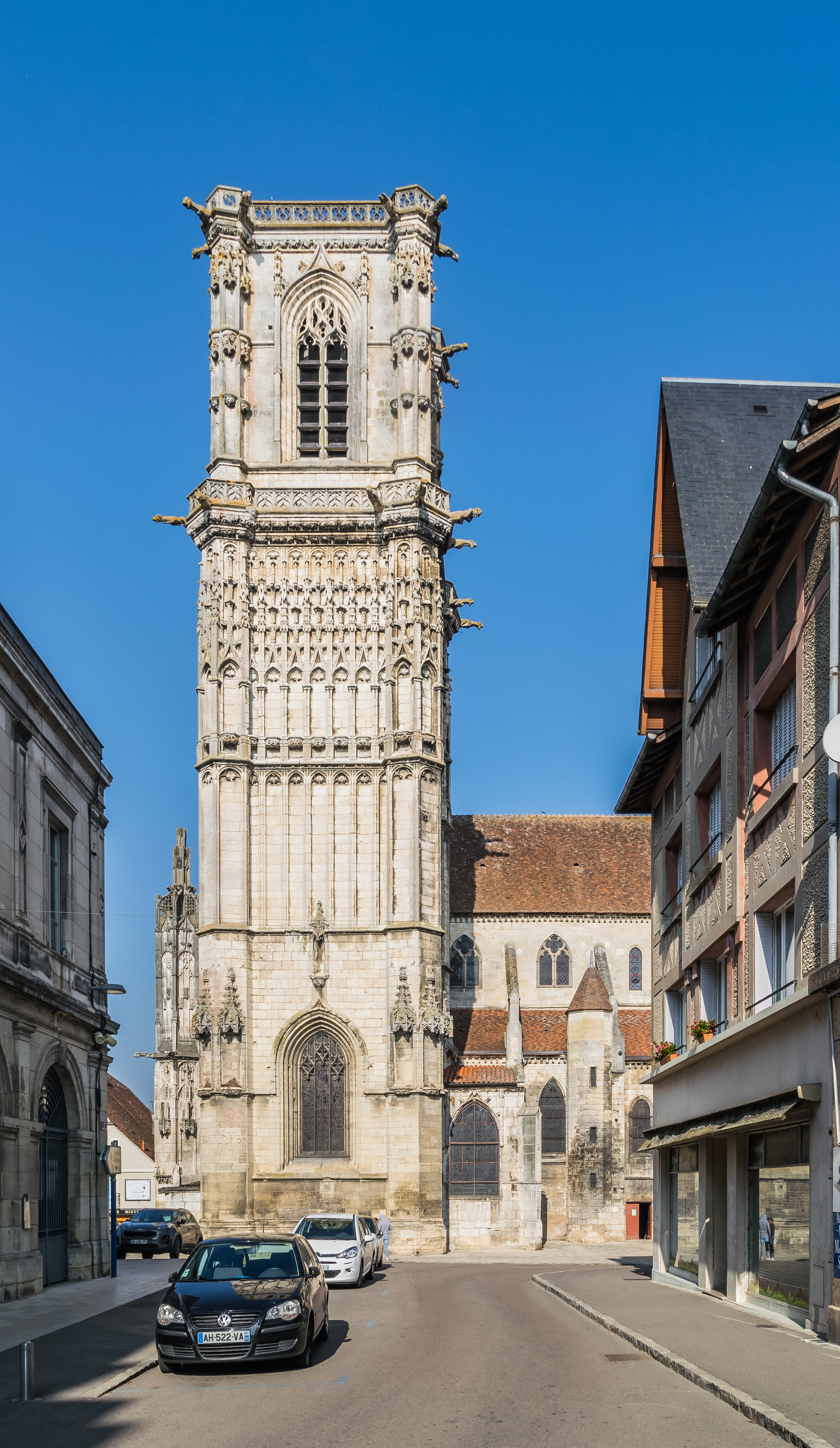
- View of the bell tower.
- Saint-Martin Church
- Location: Clamecy, Nièvre, Bourgogne-Franche-Comté, France
- Country: France

History
- Dedication: Saint Martin

Specifications
- Length: 40m
- Width: 16m

Saint-Martin Church of Clamecy (French: Église Saint-Martin de Clamecy) is a former collegiate church located in the French department of Nièvre, in the commune of Clamecy in France. The building has been classified as a historical monument since 1840.

== History ==
The construction of the church began around 1215, shortly after the charter of enfranchisement was granted to the town of Clamecy in 1213 by Count Hervé of Nevers. It was consecrated to Saint Martin in 1448.

The construction of the tower began in 1497, as evidenced by an inscription engraved on a pillar of the church. The church was completed in the early 16th century. The façade was the work of Pierre Cuvé, master stone cutter, known as Bâr-le-Duc, who is said to have perished crushed under a block of stone.

The architecture is dominated by the Flamboyant Gothic style. The bell tower is an exact replica of the bell tower of the Cathedral of Nevers. The church can be considered an example of Burgundian style.

In the late 1830s, the architect Jean-Jacques-Marie Huvé (1783–1852) carried out consolidation work on the pillars and created a false rood screen.

The church contains a Cavaillé-Coll organ from 1864, classified as a historical monument, restored in 2011 by the organ manufacture Giroud Successeurs.

== Gallery ==
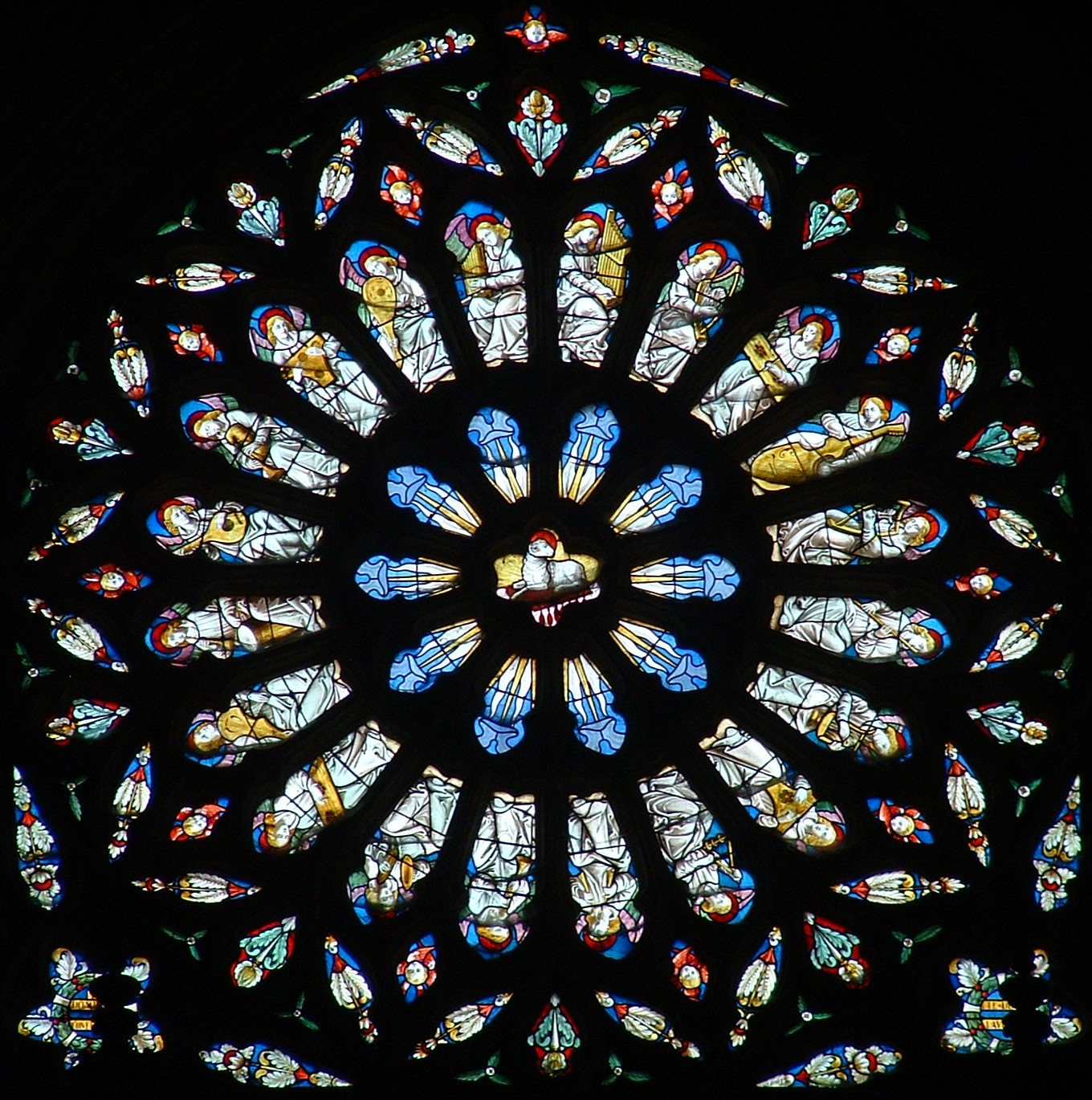
Rose window on the west façade.

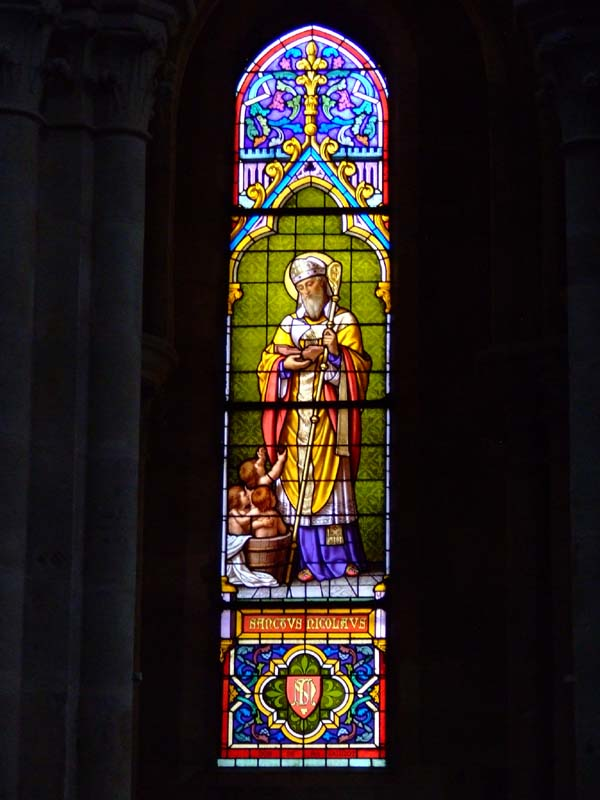
Saint Nicholas, patron of schoolchildren and children.

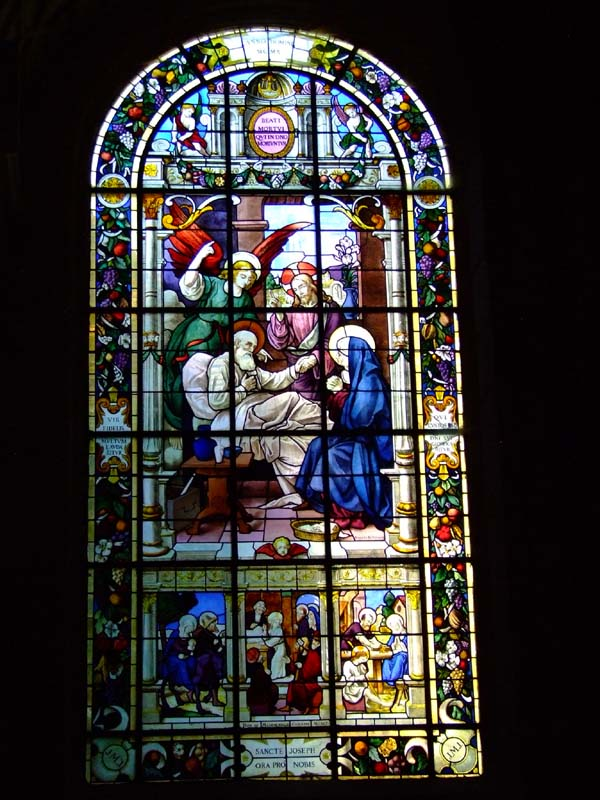
"Saint Joseph, pray for us". Patron of the Holy Family. Patron of workers and the Catholic Church.

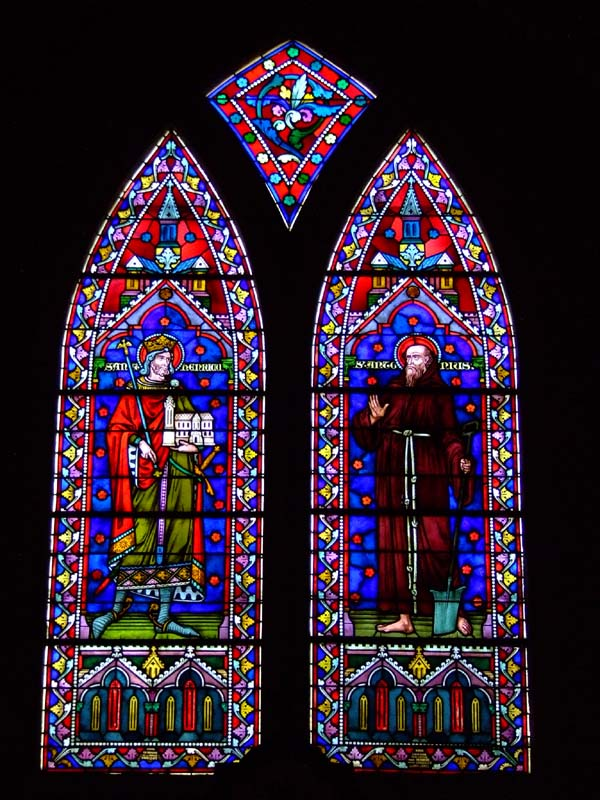
Saint Anthony of Padua (on the right), patron of sailors, the poor, pregnant mothers, horse riders, and animals.

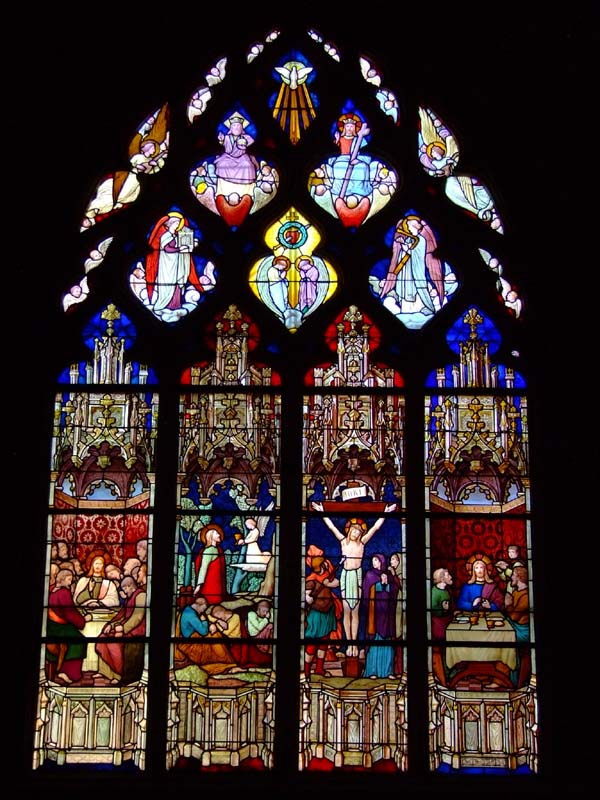
The Holy Spirit (top center). From left to right: the Last Supper, the agony of Jesus at Gethsemane; the crucifixion of Jesus; the disciples of Emmaus.

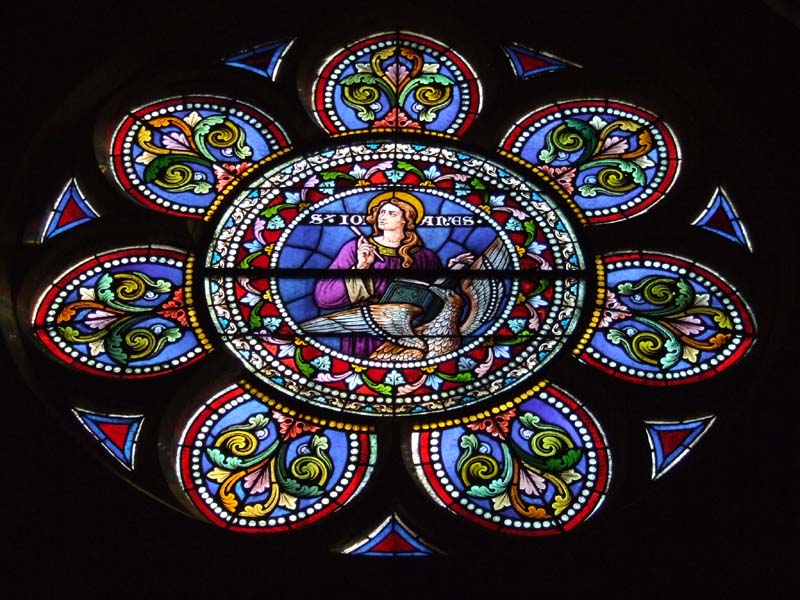
The evangelist Saint John associated with his attribute, the eagle.

== Bibliography ==
- M. Anfray, "Saint-Martin de Clamecy", La cathédrale de Nevers et les églises gothiques du Nivernais, Paris, Éditions A. et J. Picard et Cie, 1964, p. [59]-68.
- Pierre Quarré, "La collégiale Saint-Martin de Clamecy", Société française d'archéologie, volume n° 125, 1967, p. [104]-118.
