= Amay =

Municipality in Liège Province, Wallonia, Belgium

Amay: Ama (Walloon)
- Municipality
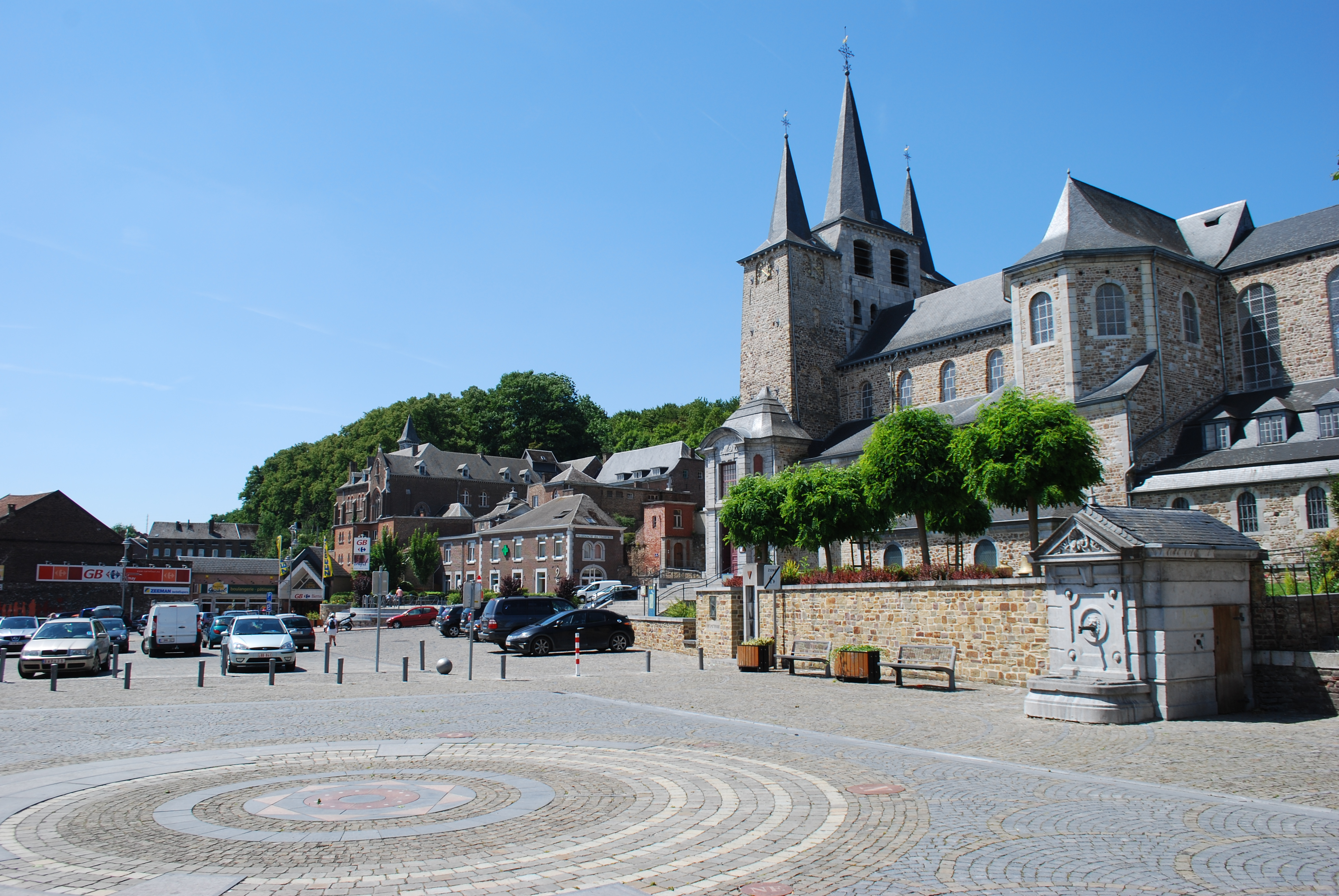
- Place Sainte-Ode with the Collegiate Church of Saint George and Saint Ode on the right

- Flag Coat of arms

- Location of Amay in the province of Liège
- Interactive map of Amay
- Location in Belgium
- Coordinates: 50°33′N 05°19′E
- Country: Belgium
- Community: French Community
- Region: Wallonia
- Province: Liège
- Arrondissement: Huy

Government
  - Mayor: Jean-Michel Javaux (Ecolo)
  - Governing parties: Ecolo, MR

Area
  - Total: 27.66 km^{2} (10.68 sq mi)

Population (2018-01-01)
  - Total: 14,305
  - Density: 517.2/km^{2} (1,339/sq mi)
- Postal codes: 4540
- NIS code: 61003
- Area codes: 085
- Website: www.amay.be

Amay (French pronunciation: [amɛ]; Walloon: Ama) is a municipality of Wallonia located in the province of Liège, Belgium.

On 1 January 2006 Amay had a total population of approximately 14,231. The total area is 27.61 km^{2} which gives a population density of approximately 476 inhabitants per km^{2}. It owes its site to a ford of the Meuse that was still in use in the Middle Ages but had begun as a Gallo-Roman vicus of the civitas Tungrorum (Tongeren).

The municipality consists of the following districts: Amay, Ampsin, Flône, Jehay, and Ombret-Rawsa.

The headquarters of the recently-established 1st Fusilier Battalion were in Amay in late 2026, as part of the recent expansion and strengthening of the Belgian Army.

== Places of interest ==
The Collegiate Church of Saint George and Saint Ode in Amay is traces its origins to a 6th-century sanctuary.

- Castle of Jehay-Bodegnée, a 16th-century castle

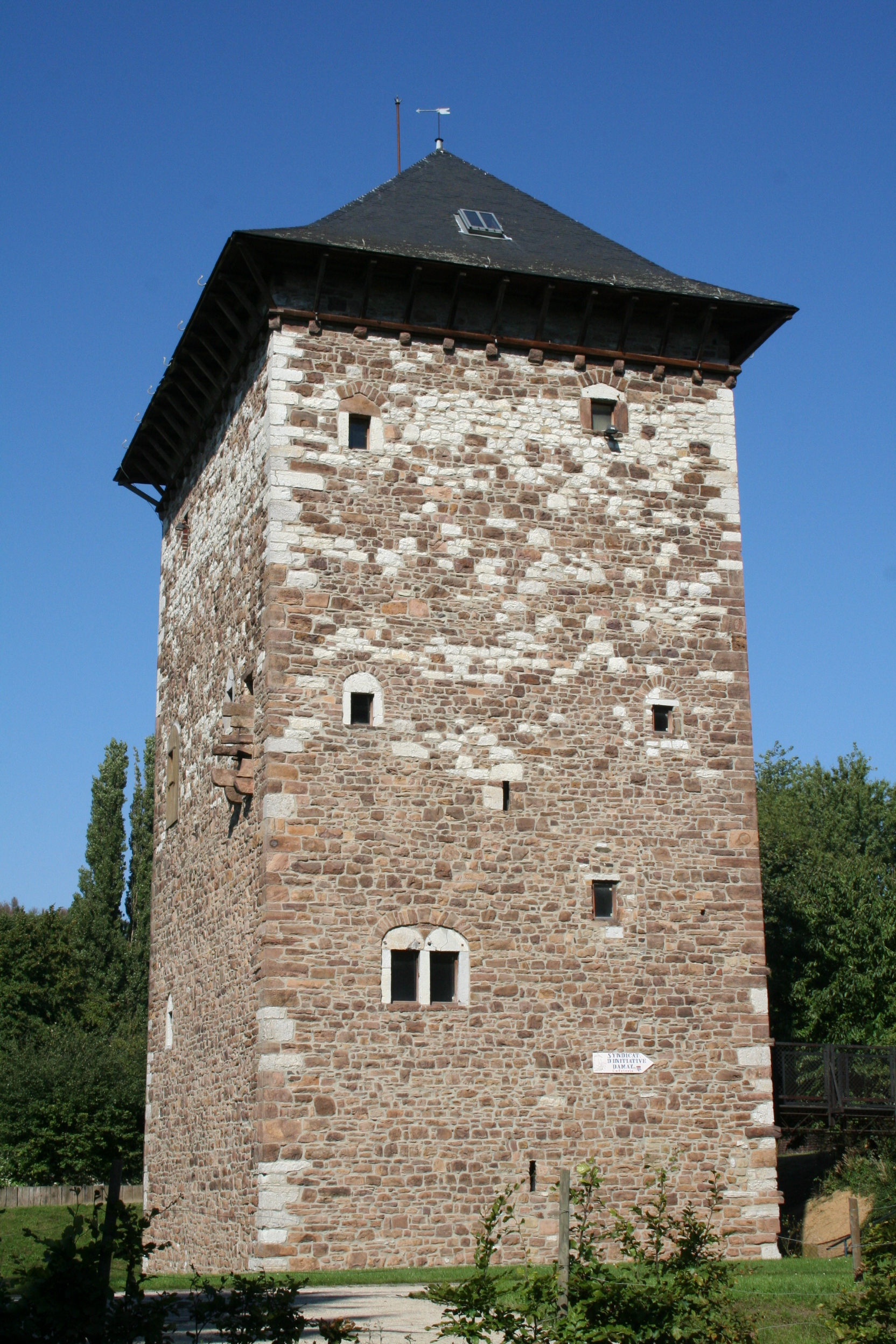
Old Romanesque tower (12th century)

== Famous inhabitants ==
- François Walther de Sluze (1622–1685), mathematician and abbot of Amay
- Zénobe Gramme (1824-1902), inventor of the dynamo
