= Aldeneik Abbey =

Coordinates: 51.1020°N 5.8056°E

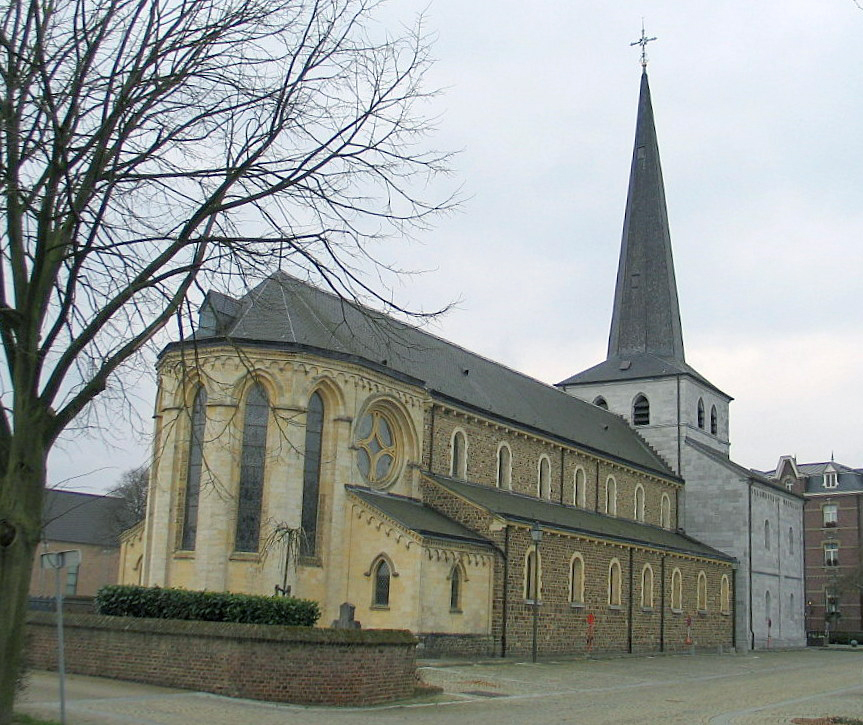
Church of Saint Anne's, formerly Aldeneik Abbey church

Aldeneik Abbey (Dutch: Klooster van Aldeneik) is a former Benedictine abbey in Aldeneik, currently a mainly residential parish of Maaseik, in the province of Limburg in eastern Belgium. It was founded in 728. The Benedictine nuns were replaced by canons in the 10th century. In the 16th century the canons moved to nearby Maaseik, and Aldeneik was abandoned.

== History ==
According to the vita of Harlindis and Relindis (written around 860), these two sisters in 720 founded a monastery along the river Meuse, on territory belonging to their father Adelard. With the support of Willibrord of Utrecht, the abbey was officially established, adhering to the rule of Saint Benedict, and the two sisters became abbesses. The abbey was probably destroyed by Viking raids in the 9th century. A century later it was given to Richer, Bishop of Liège, who in 952 made it a religious chapter with 12 canons. Under the leadership of their abbot they continued to live, work and pray in Aldeneik for more than six centuries.

In 1571, during the wars following the Protestant Reformation, the canons - with their treasure - took refuge in the nearby town of Maaseik. Here, the predecessor of the church of Saint Catherine became the chapter's private church. The canons sold their property in Aldeneik in order to buy houses in Maaseik where they continued to live peacefully for another 240 years. After the arrival of the French revolutionary troops in 1793, the chapter was dissolved in 1797. The church fell into disrepair and was demolished. In 1840-45 the current Neoclassical church was built, but the chapter was never restored.

At the original abbey location in Aldeneik only the heavily-restored former abbey church remains, which still serves as a parish church and is now dedicated to Saint Anne (Church of Saint Anne, Aldeneik). Nothing of the cloisters, nor the later chapter house or canon's houses have been preserved.

== Treasure ==
The treasure of the abbey, preserved in the church of Saint Catherine in Maaseik, is presented in a small museum located in the crypt of the church. The main treasure is a manuscript of the early 8th century, the Codex Eyckensis, considered to be the oldest book in Belgium. An important collection of medieval textiles consists of a garment said to have belonged to Saint Relindis and Anglo-Saxon liturgical embroidery dating from the 8th or 9th century. Several other relics of the abbey founders, Harlindis and Relindis, have survived in the treasury. Other important pieces in the collection are reliquaries (some dating back to the 9th century), liturgical vessels made of gold and silver, paraments, and ancient manuscripts.

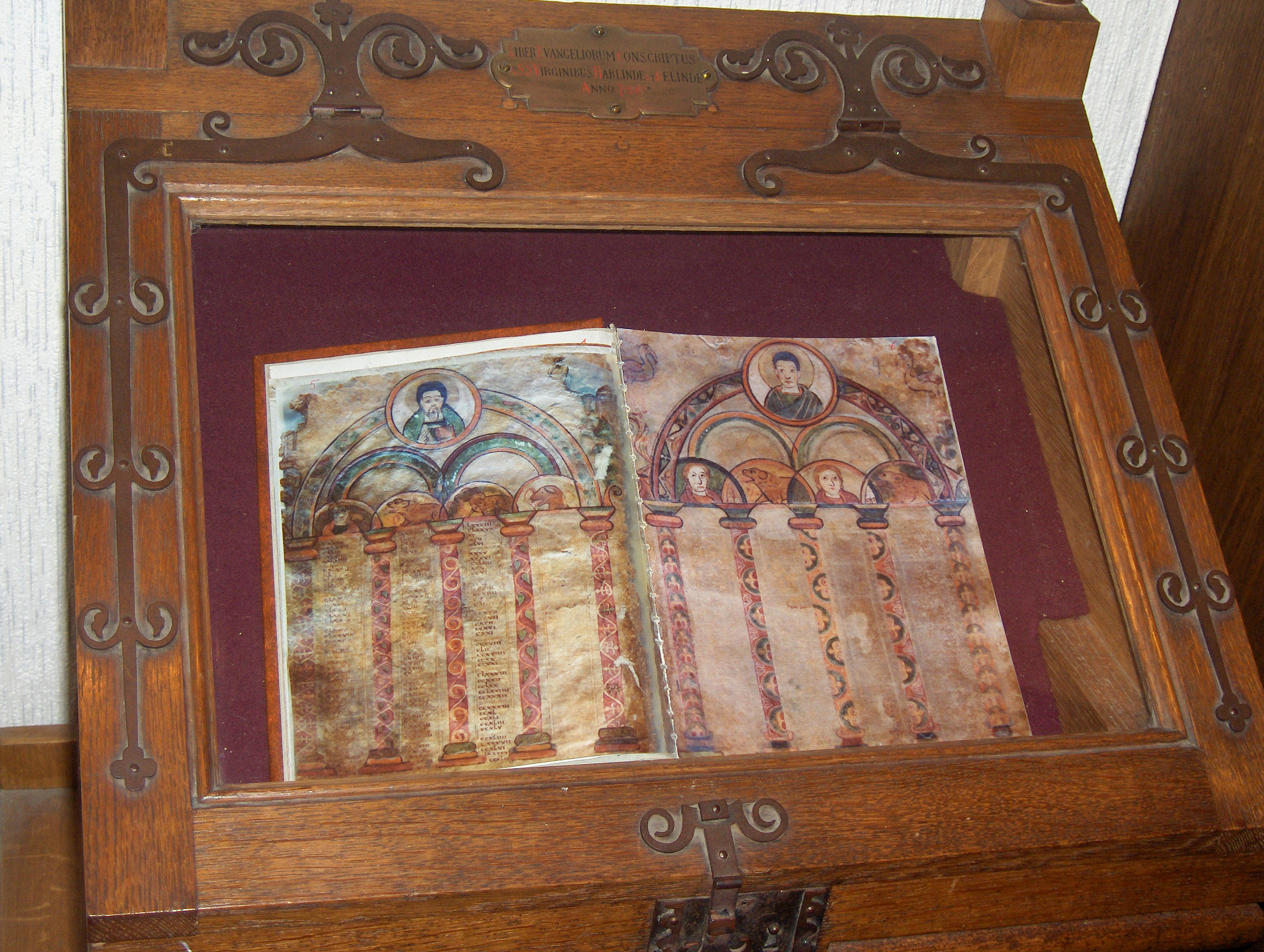
Codex Eyckensis (8th century)

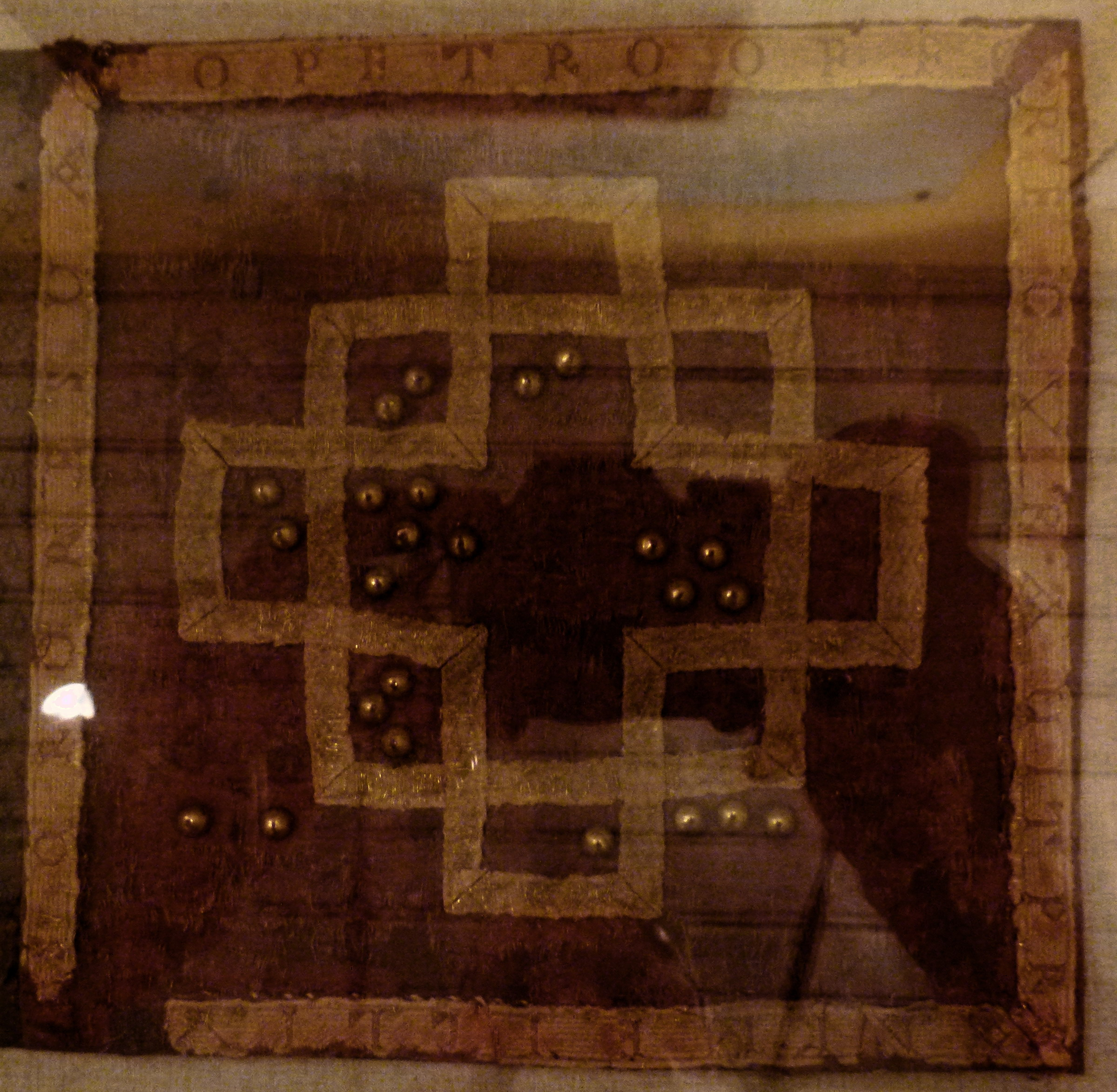
Velamen of Harlindis (silk, 8th or 9th century)

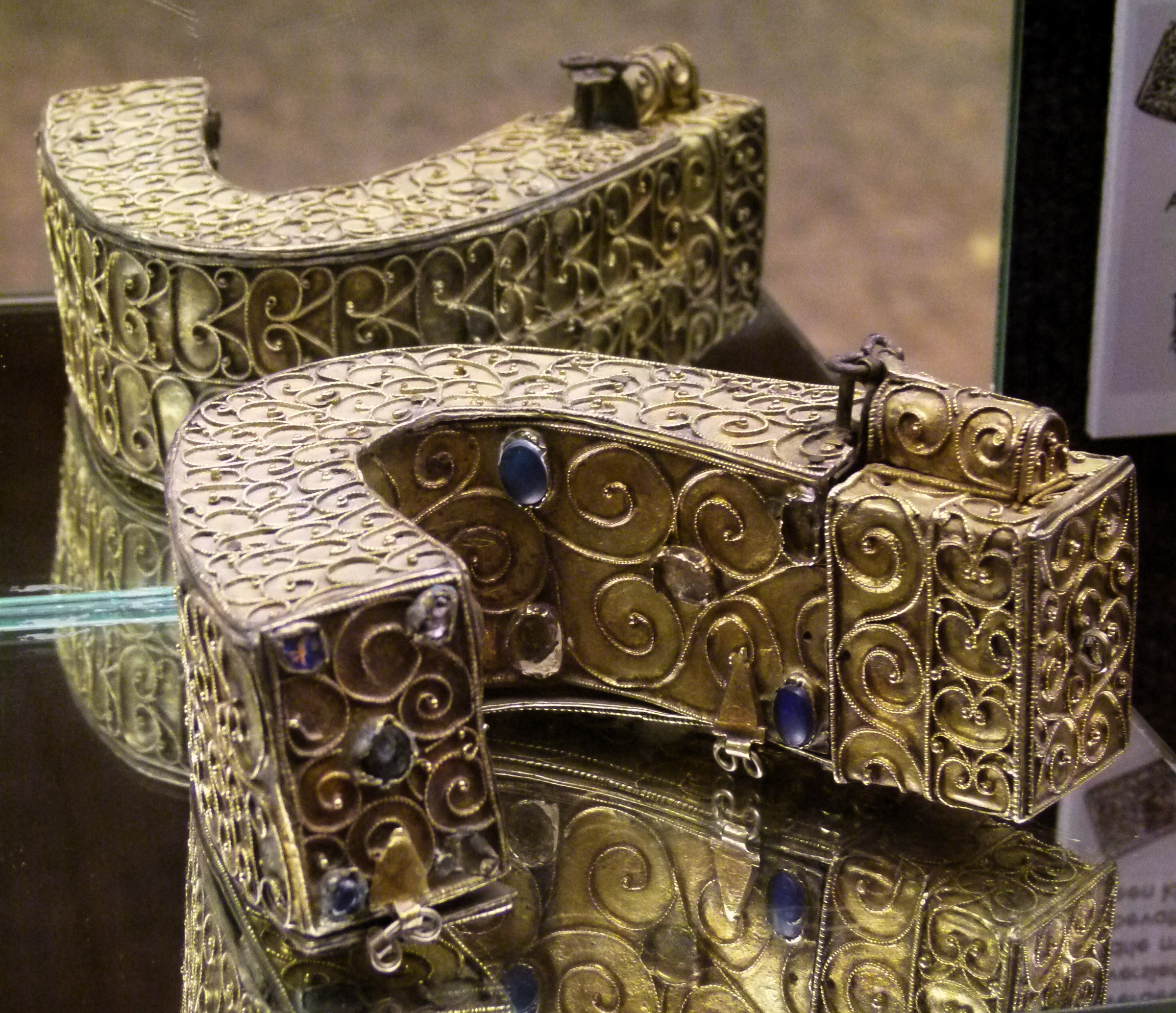
Maxilla reliquary (silver, 10th century)

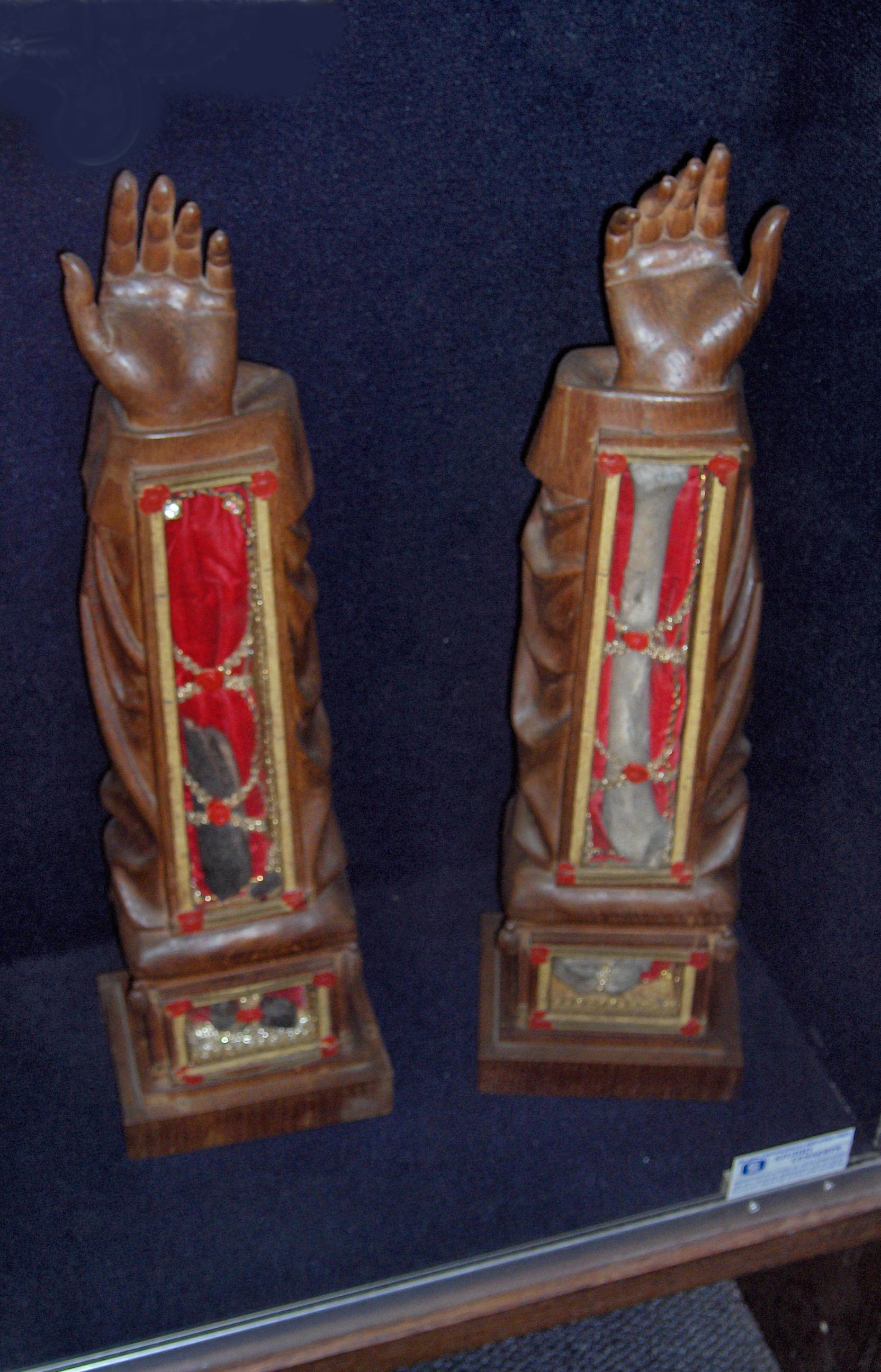
Relics of Harlindis and Relindis (1652)

== See also ==
- Church of Saint Anne, Aldeneik
