= Ommegang =

Generic term for medieval pageants celebrated in the Low Countries

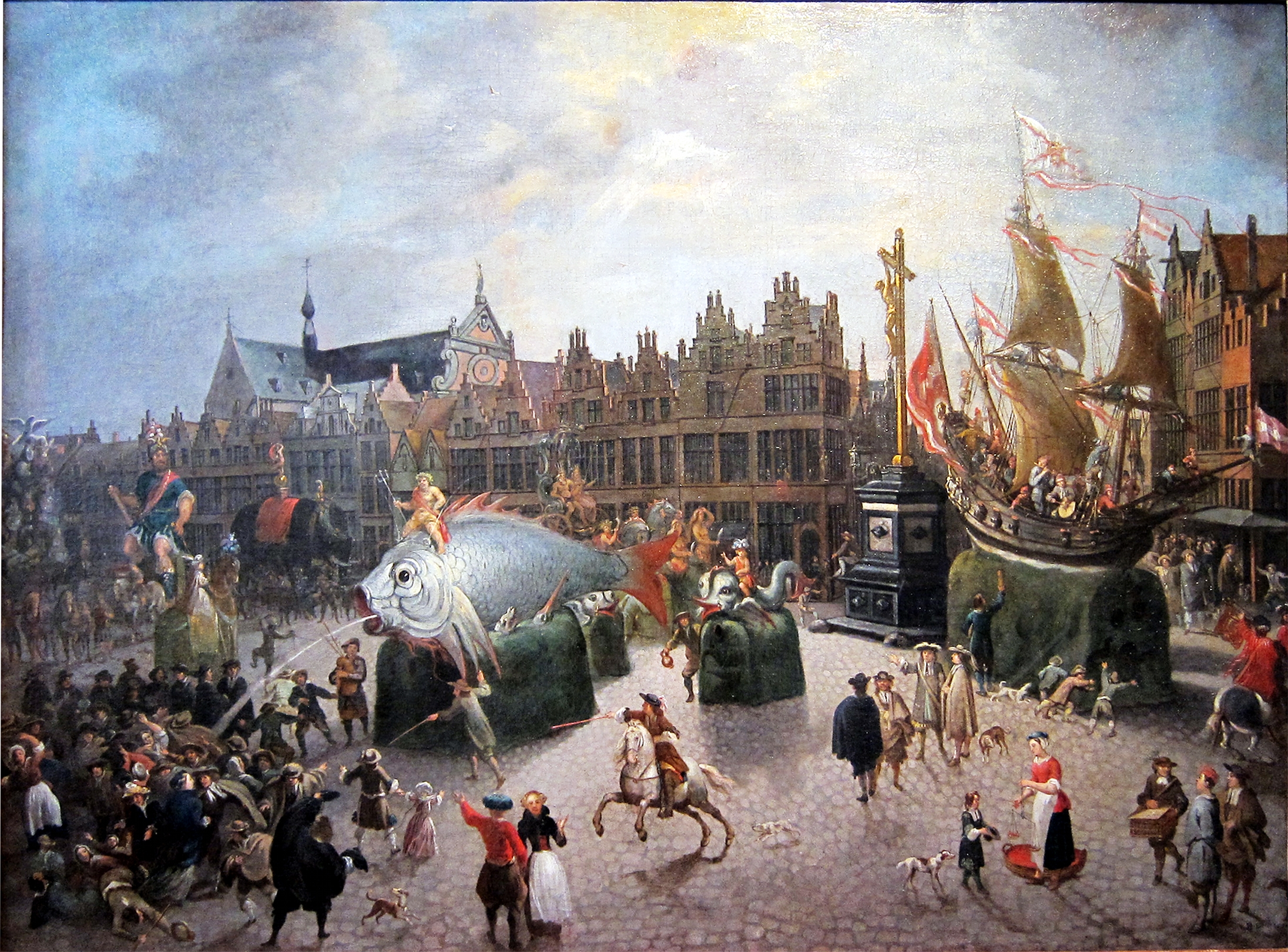
The Ommegang in Antwerp, by Erasmus de Bie

Ommegang or Ommeganck (Dutch: "walk around" (the church, village or city), Dutch pronunciation: [ˈɔməˌɣɑŋ]) is the generic name for various medieval pageants celebrated in the Low Countries (areas that are now within Belgium, the Netherlands, and northern France).

== Ommegang of Antwerp ==
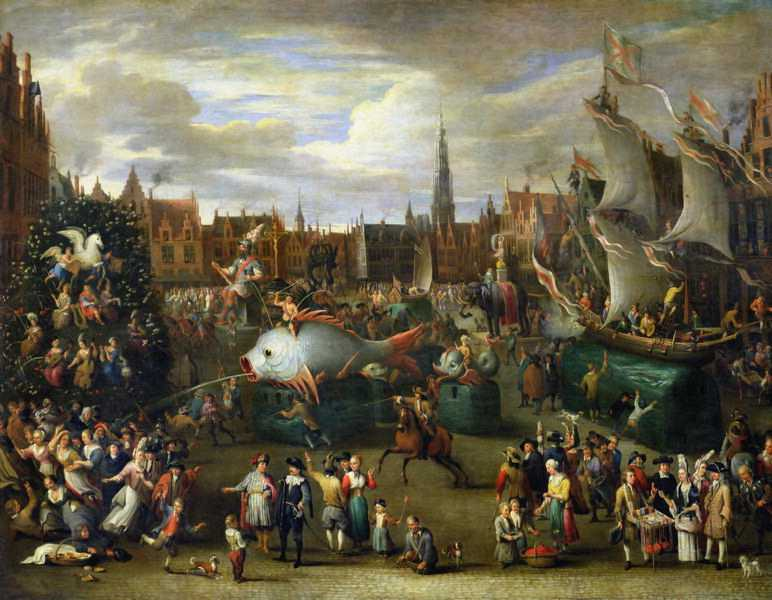
The Ommegang in Antwerp by Alexander van Bredael

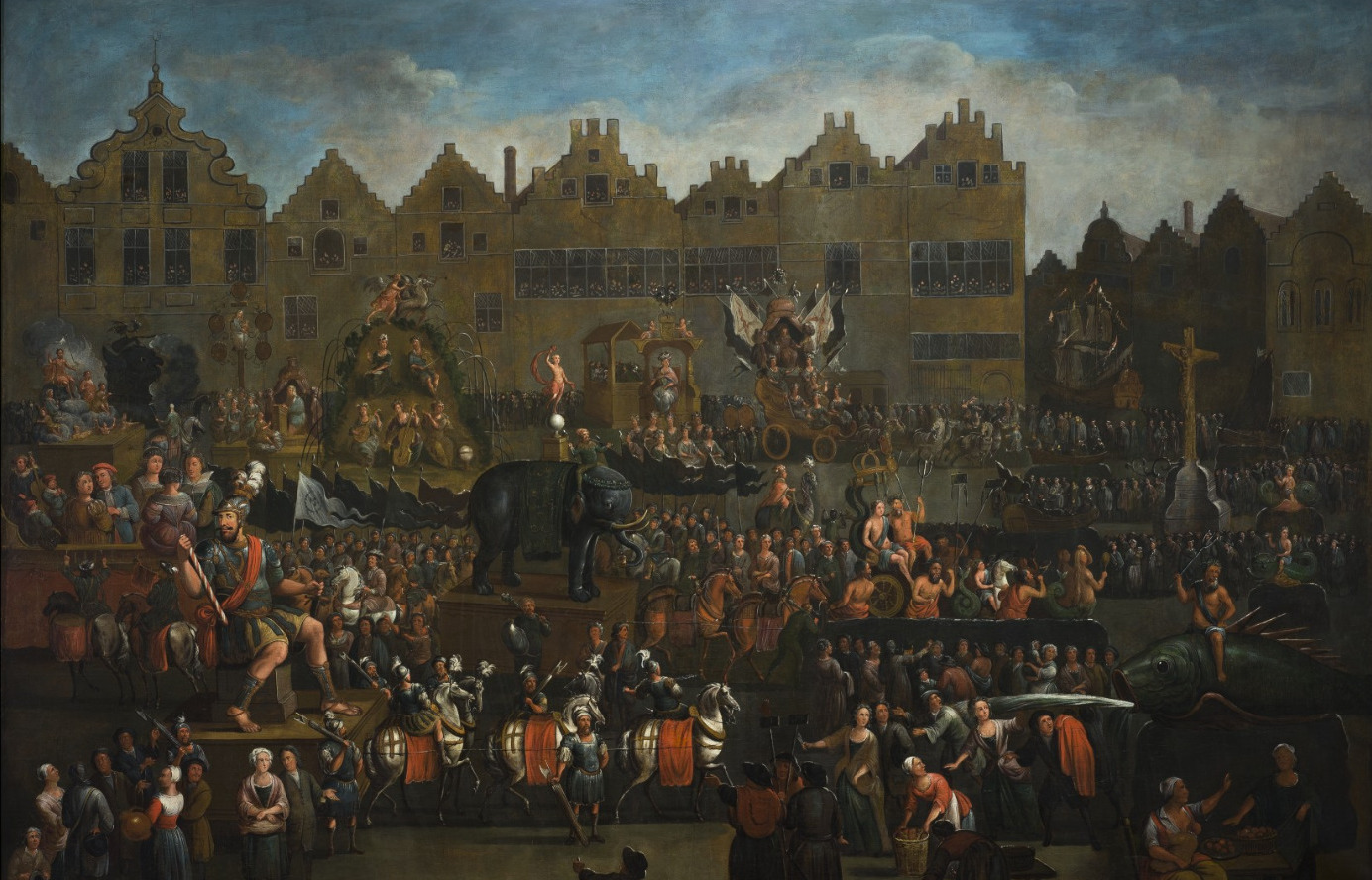
The Ommegang on the Meir in Antwerp in 1685 by Alexander Casteels the Younger

The Ommegang in Antwerp originated in the 14th century and is held on 15 August. There were two Ommegang processions held in Antwerp each year:

- the "Sinksenommegang": held on Pentecost Sunday
- the "Onze Lieve Vrouwommegang": the first Sunday after the Assumption of Mary (15 August).

In the 15th, 16th and 17th century the Ommegang of Antwerp was the most important in Flanders. The "Onze Lieve Vrouwommegang" consisted originally of two events: the first celebrated the religious feast of the Assumption of Mary. The second was a large, opulent secular participation of the guilds, crafts and chambers of rhetoric, each of which contributed a float to a procession through the streets of Antwerp. Some floats contained references to events of the preceding year. There was considerable rivalry between the guilds in their efforts to provide the most splendid display.

In the 17th century the Ommegang of Antwerp comprised these elements in the following order:

- the 27 Trades of Antwerp;
- "de Zottekens", comprising the mentally ill from the madhouse of Saint Rochus. Their participation was intended to promote their acceptance in society and to encourage the spectators to pray for their own mental health;
- four trumpets and a drum;
- the ship, originally made by the Guild of the skippers for the Joyous Entry of Charles V in 1549, symbolised the wealth of Antwerp;
- three small foreign ships and seamen carrying goods of these nations;
- the whale, in memory of a whale that swam up the Scheldt river and was killed by Antwerp citizens who extracted the whale oil from it. On the whale's back sat a Cupid with a water spout, who sprinkled water on the crowd. In 1649 and 1662 Cupid was replaced by Orpheus, as can be seen in our painting; in 1685 and in 1698 by Neptune and in 1609 by Arion. The whale referred of course to the dangers at sea;
- two dolphins with two naked children sitting on top of them, referring to the dolphins habit of playing with children. Sabbe mentions that the bases of the whale and of the dolphins were decorated with paintings of fish (as can indeed be seen in our painting);
- the float of Neptune and Amphitrite;
- a sculpted elephant (remembering the first one that had arrived in Antwerp in 1563) with a sculpture of Fortuna on a globe, holding a veil. Just like the wind blowing the veil luck may change at any moment;
- the giant Druon Antigoon. the giant who according to Antwerp legend had his hand cut off by Antwerp's mythical hero Brabo;
- an entourage of childlike jumping male and female giants of foreign countries;
- Brabo and a group of young cavaliers;
- groups representing events that had occurred in the preceding year;
- a combination of Mount Parnassus with Apollo and of Mount Helicon with the Nine Muses and Pegasus;
- the float of the Virgins, originally representing Antwerp and the 17 Provinces of the Low Countries, later the beautiful young women of the town;
- a jumping, dancing blackamoor, holding a sword, leading a camel with a (Persian) prince;
- the important religious part of the procession with several floats;
- finally the clergy and the Guilds of the Fencers (in 1662 with Saint Michael holding the devil by a leach), of the Arquebusiers (with Saint Christopher carrying the infant Jesus), of the old and the young bow (with Saint Sebastian), of the old and the new crossbow (with Saint George and the dragon).

The Ommegang in Antwerp has been depicted in several paintings by Antwerp artists such as Erasmus de Bie, Alexander van Bredael, Alexander Casteels the Younger and Pieter van Aelst.

== Ommegang of Brussels ==
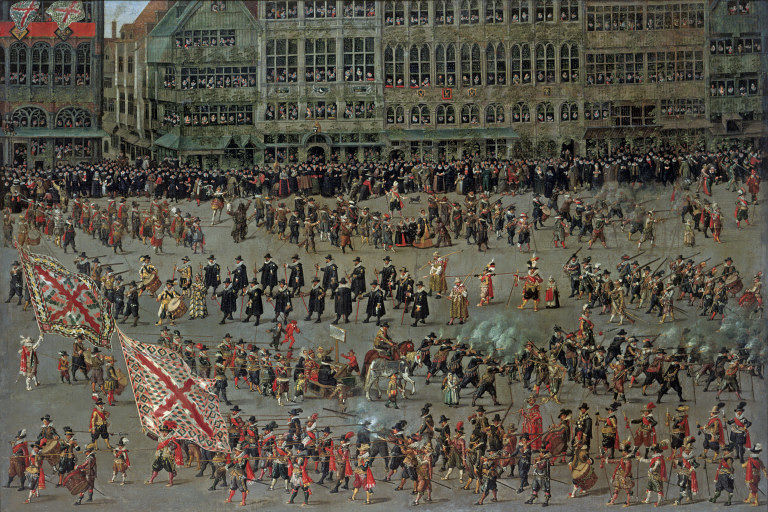
The Ommegang in Brussels on 31 May 1615, by Denis van Alsloot

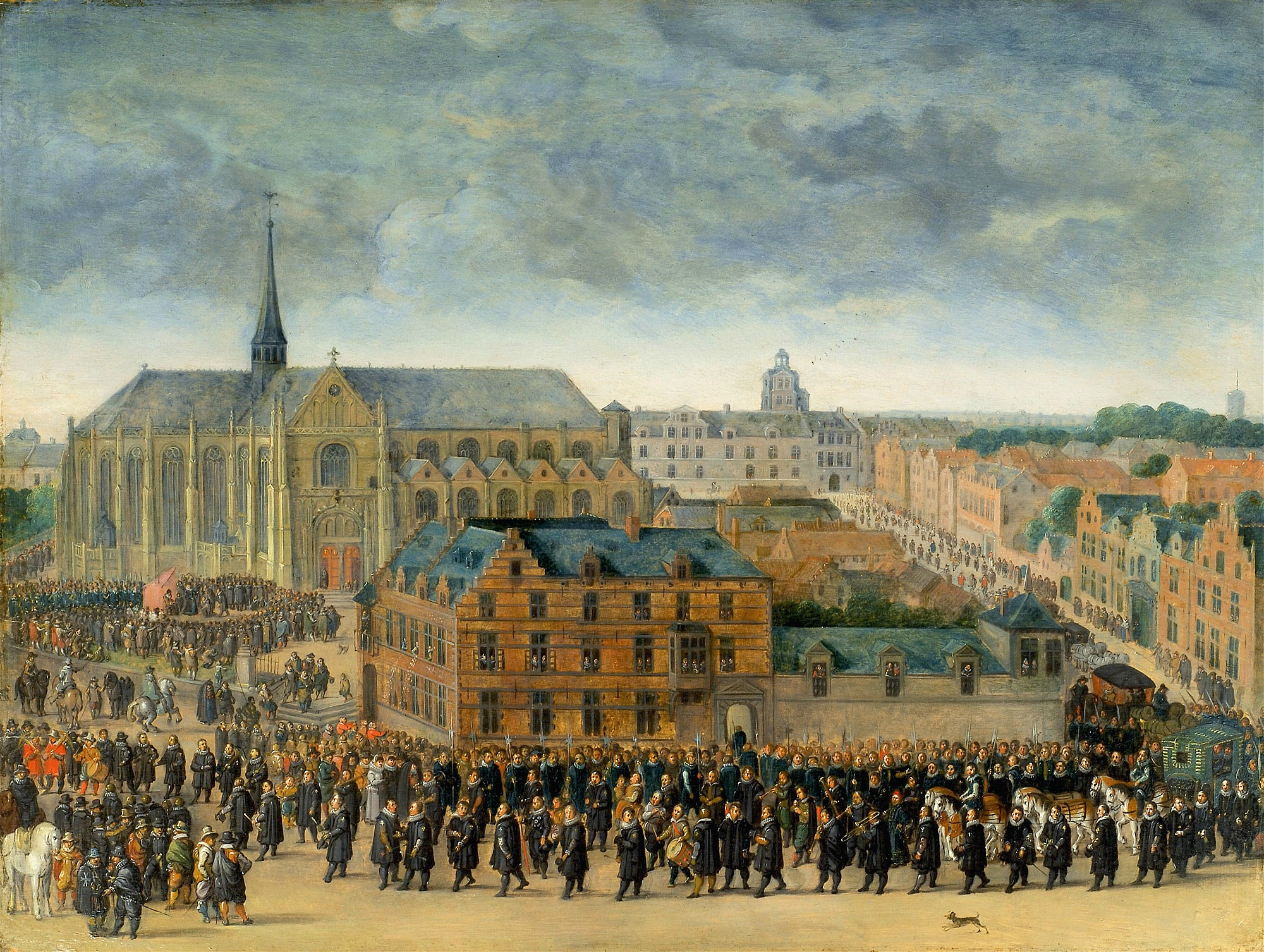
The Infanta Isabella shooting the Grand Serment bird with a crossbow at the Sablon during the Ommegang in Brussels of 31 May 1615, by Antoon Sallaert

The Ommegang of Brussels is celebrated every July in Brussels. According to legend, the origin of the Ommegang of Brussels goes back to a local devout woman named Beatrix (Béatrice or Beatrijs) Soetkens. She had a vision in which the Virgin Mary instructed her to steal the miraculous statue of Onze-Lieve-Vrouw op 't Stocxken ("Our Lady on the Little Stick") from the Cathedral of Our Lady in Antwerp, bring it to Brussels, and place it in the chapel of the Crossbowmen's Guild in the Sablon/Zavel district. The woman stole the statue, and through a series of miraculous events, was able to transport it to Brussels by boat in 1348. It was then solemnly placed in the chapel and venerated as the guild's patron. The guild also promised to hold an annual procession, called an Ommegang, in which the statue was carried through Brussels.

Through the following decades, what was originally a religious procession took on gradually a more worldly outlook. The Ommegang of 1549 corresponds to a golden age of the procession. From the mid-16th century, the Ommegang not only celebrated the miraculous legend, but from 1549, became intertwined with the Joyous Entry of Holy Roman Emperor, Charles V, and his son, Philip II, then-crown prince of the Seventeen Provinces of the Netherlands. On that occasion, Brussels' elites wished to honour the Emperor and his son by organising spectacular equestrian parades in the Sablon and on the Grand-Place/Grote Markt. The Ommegang thus developed into an important religious and civil event in the city's annual calendar.

== Other examples of Ommegang ==
Another famous Ommegang in Belgium is the Ros Beiaard Ommegang in Dendermonde. In this Ommegang, which is held every ten years, a giant wooden horse is displayed in the town centre. Four boys from the same family of Dendermonde have the honour to 'ride' the horse while it is on display.

The annual Ducasse in Ath has one of the largest of city giants: Gouyasse (Goliath).

An infrequent Ommegang, only held once every 25 years, is part of the Cavalcade of Hanswijck in Mechelen. The Ommegang element evolved from the annual procession around the city walls held since 1330 as a token of gratitude to Mechelen's patron Saint Rumbold who 'miraculously' ended a siege. A Ros Beiaard which is smaller but older than the one in Dendermonde is mounted in the same manner and the 'family' of six city giants stands out. As in other cities, the commemoration became located largely within its centre.

An Ommegang is held every twenty-five years to commemorate the transfer of the relics of Saints Herlindis and Relindis from the Sint-Anna Church in Aldeneik to Sint-Catharinakerk in Maaseik. The most recent was held in 2022.

Many of these traditions in Belgium and (with only two exceptions, formerly Flemish northern) France are protected as an oral and immaterial cultural legacy by UNESCO, with reference to physical artefacts such as Giants and Dragons (the latter referring to any kind of mythical animals) carried by humans.
