= Codex Eyckensis =

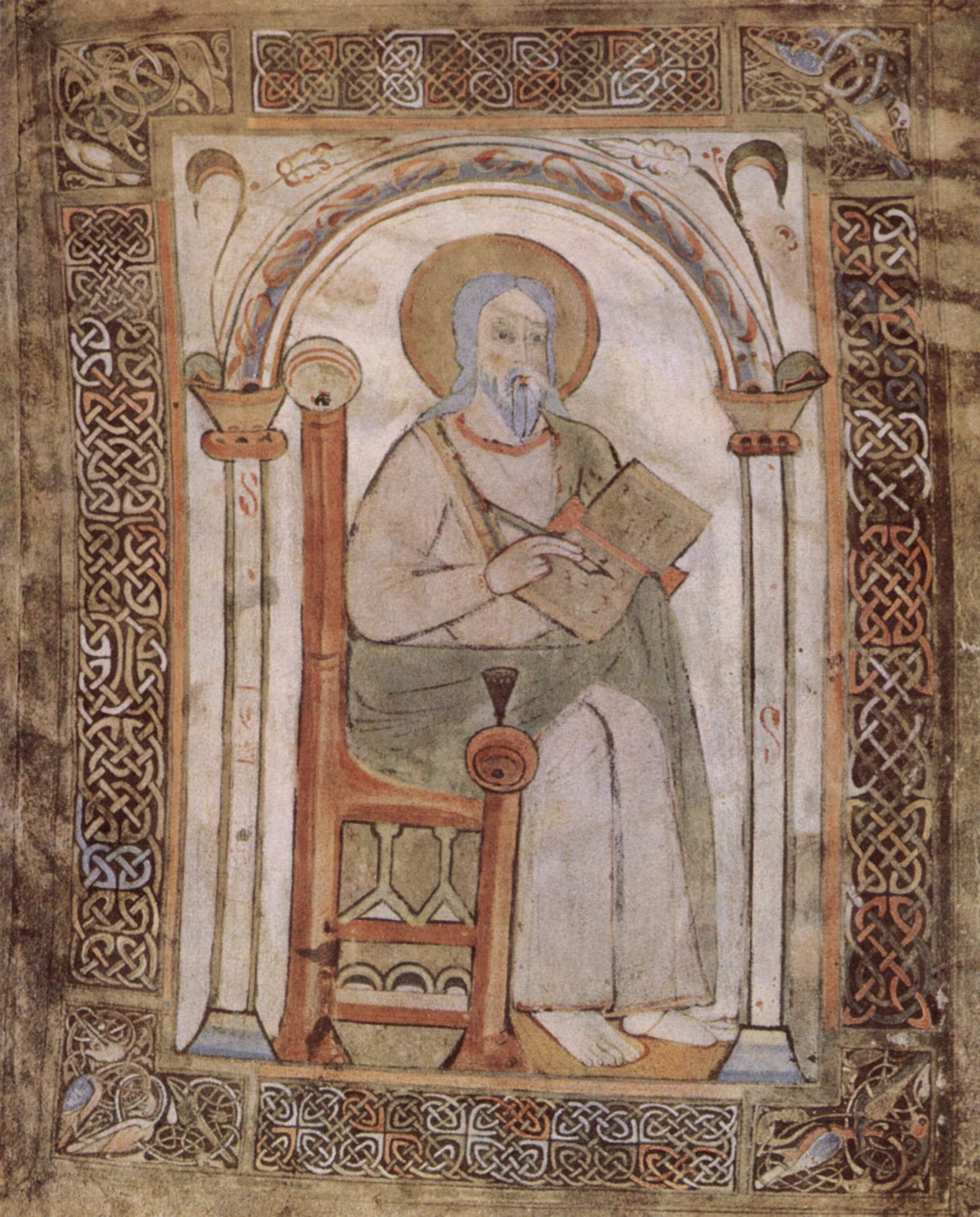
Full-page depiction of an evangelist

The eighth-century Codex Eyckensis is a Gospel Book based on two constituent manuscripts that were bound as a single codex from (presumably) the twelfth century until 1988. The Codex Eyckensis is the oldest book in Belgium. Since the eighth century, it has been kept and preserved on the territory of the present-day municipality of Maaseik, in Belgium (hence the name "Eyckensis"). The book was probably produced in the scriptorium in the Abbey of Echternach. It is housed in the church of St Catherine in Maaseik.

== Descriptions of manuscript A and manuscript B ==
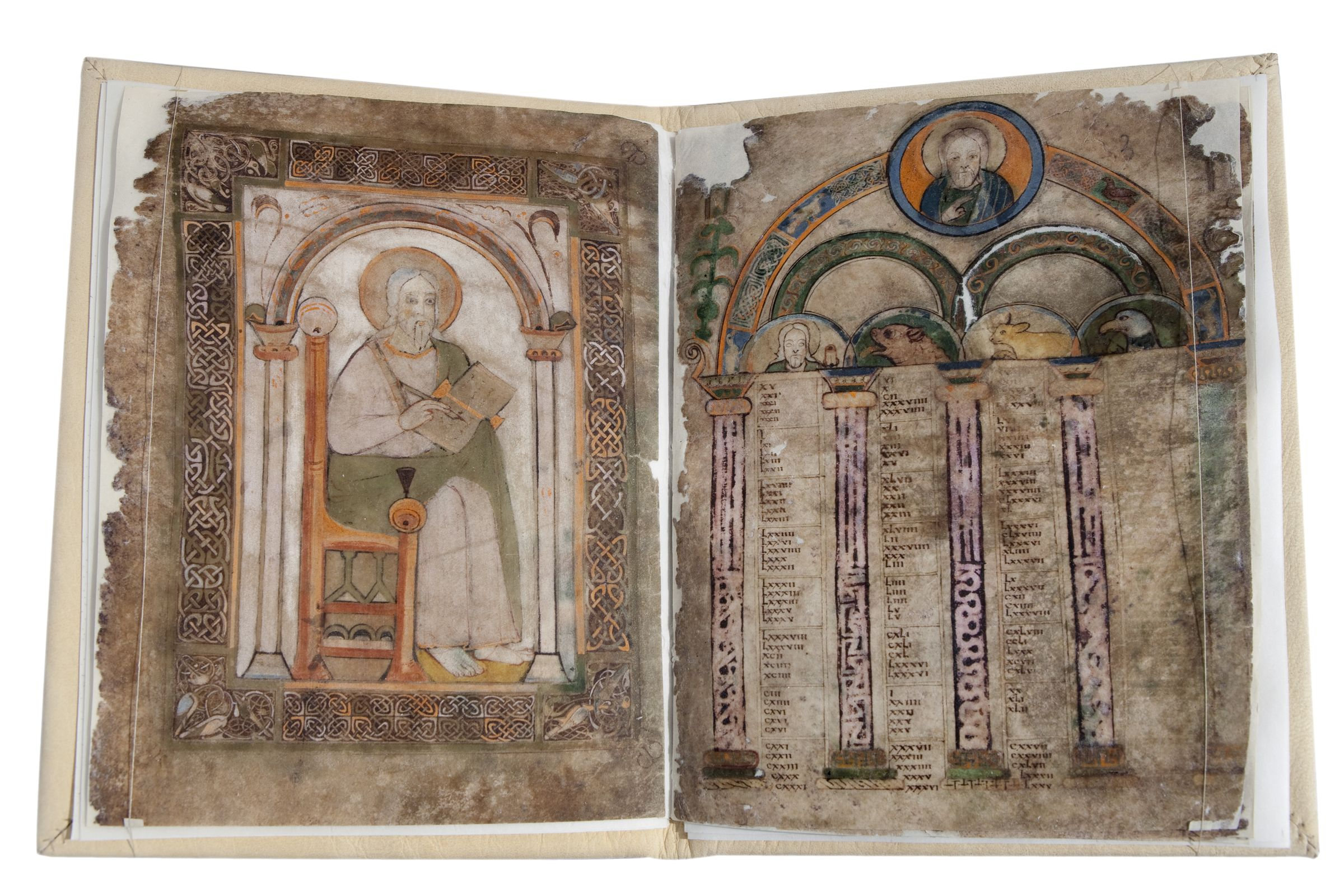
Full-page evangelist portrait and canon tables in the Codex Eyckensis A.

The Codex Eyckensis consists of two Gospel Books on 133 parchment folios measuring 244 by 183 mm each.

The first manuscript (Codex A) is incomplete. It consists of five folios, opening with a full-page Evangelist portrait (presumably depicting Saint Matthew), followed by an incomplete set of eight Canon Tables. The Evangelist portrait is rendered in Italian-Byzantine style, which is clearly related to that of the Barberini Gospels currently kept in the Vatican Library (Barberini Lat. 570). The portrait is framed in a border of insular knotwork, comparable to the decorative elements in the Lindisfarne Gospels.

The Canon Tables provide an overview of corresponding passages in the four Gospels. In this way, the Canon Tables serve as table of contents and index to ease access to the texts. The Canon Tables in manuscript A are decorated with columns and arcades, the symbols of the four Evangelists and portraits of saints.

The second manuscript (Codex B) contains a full set of twelve Canon Tables and all four Gospel texts in Latin. The Canon Tables are embellished with columns and arcades, depictions of Apostles and the Evangelists’ symbols. The Gospel texts are written in a rounded form of the insular minuscule, which was characteristic of British and Irish manuscripts from the seventh and eighth centuries, but was also used in mainland Europe. The initial capital of each paragraph is outlined with red and yellow dots. The text was copied by a single scribe.

The Gospel text is a version of the Vulgate, mostly as translated by Saint Jerome (Hieronymus of Stridon, 347–420 CE), with a number of additions and transpositions. Comparable versions of the Gospel texts can be found in the Book of Kells (Dublin, Trinity College, ms 58), the Book of Armagh (Dublin, Trinity College, ms 52) and the Echternach Gospels (Paris, BnF, ms Lat.9389).

== History (origin to 20th century) ==
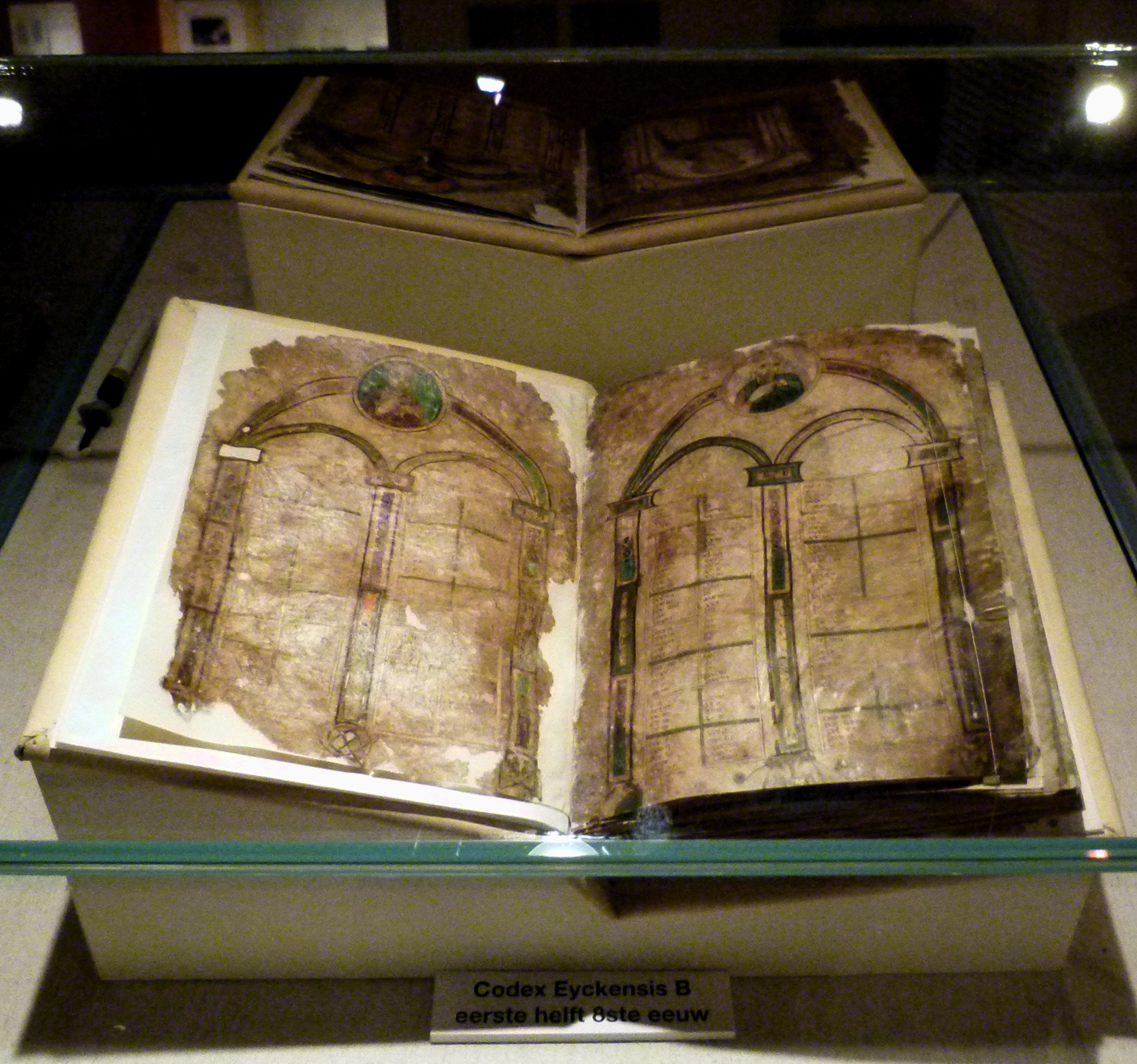
The Codex Eyckensis displayed in St Catherine's Church, Maaseik

The Codex dates from the eighth century and was first kept at the former Benedictine abbey of Aldeneik, which was consecrated in 728 CE. The Merovingian nobles Adelard, Lord of Denain, and his wife Grinuara founded this abbey for their daughters Harlindis and Relindis in “a small and useless wood" near the river Meuse. The convent was named Eyke (“oak”), for the oak trees that grew there. Later, as the neighbouring village of Nieuw-Eyke (“new oak”—present-day Maaseik) grew and became more important, the name of the original village became Aldeneik (“old oak”). Saint Willibrord consecrated Harlindis as the first abbess of this religious community. After her demise, Saint-Boniface consecrated her sister Relindis as her successor.

The Codex Eyckensis was used at the convent to study and also to promulgate the teachings of Christ. Both evangelistaries that now constitute the Codex Eyckensis were presumably brought from the Abbey of Echternach to Aldeneik by Saint Willibrord.

The two manuscripts were merged into one binding, most likely in the course of the twelfth century.

In 1571, the abbey of Aldeneik was abandoned. From the middle of the tenth century, the Benedictine nuns had been replaced by a collegiate chapter of male canons. With the increasing threat of religious war, the canons took refuge in the walled town of Maaseik. They brought the church treasures from Aldeneik—including the Codex Eyckensis—to Saint Catherine's church.

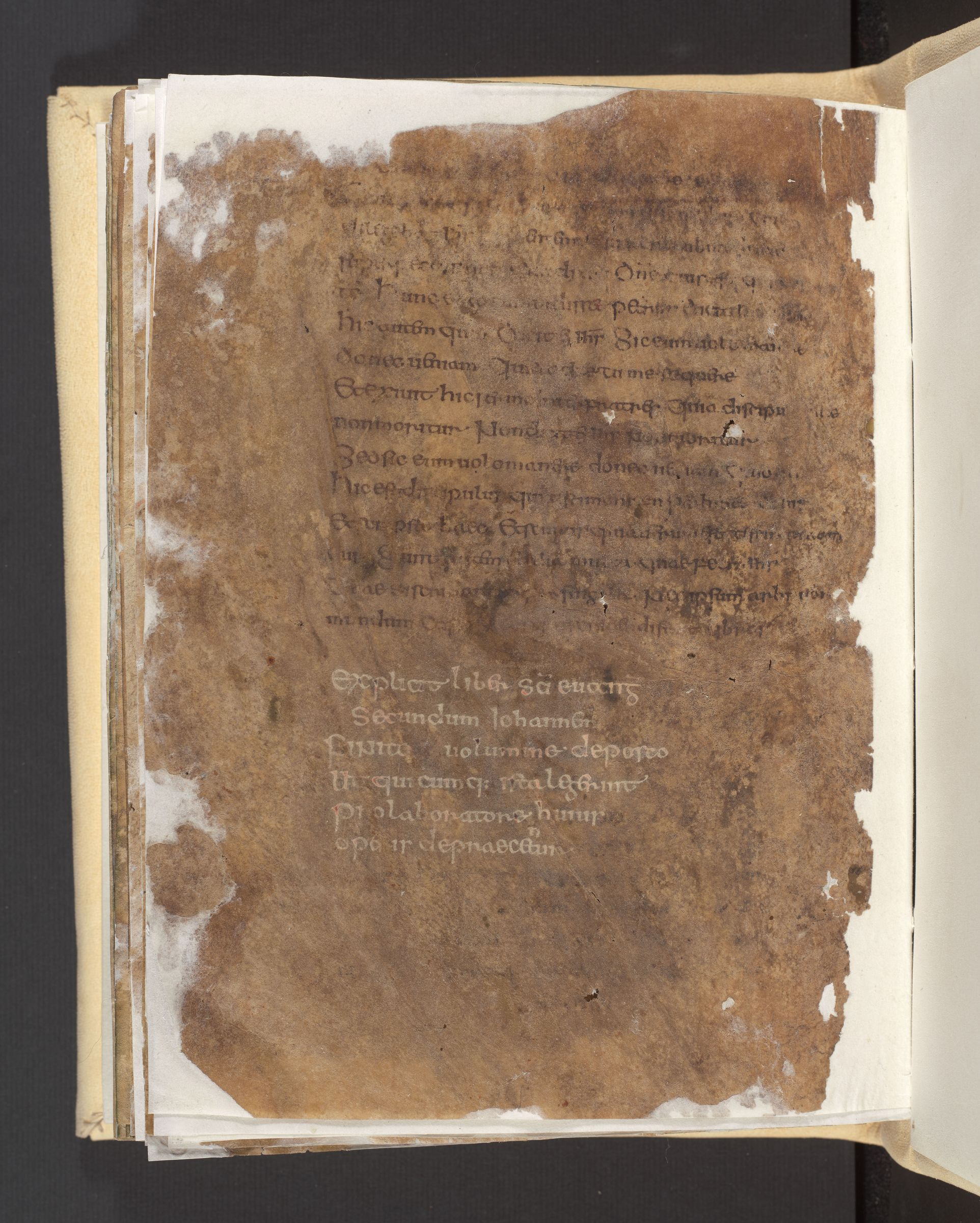
Text folio in the Codex B

== Authorship ==
For centuries, people were convinced the Codex Eyckensis had been written by Harlindis and Relindis, the first abbesses of the abbey of Aldeneik, who were later canonized. Their hagiography was written down in the course of the ninth century by a local priest. This text mentions that Harlindis and Relindis had also written an evangelistary. In the course of the ninth century the cult of the relics of the saintly sisters became increasingly important and included the veneration of the Codex Eyckensis, which inspired deep reverence as a work produced by Harlindis and Relindis themselves.

However, the final lines of the second manuscript refute this explicitly: Finito volumine deposco ut quicumque ista legerint pro laboratore huius operis depraecentur (At the completion of this volume, I ask all who read this to pray for the worker who made this manuscript). The male form laborator (“worker”) clearly indicates that the person who wrote the manuscript was a man.

A comparative analysis performed in 1994 by Albert Derolez (University of Ghent) and Nancy Netzer (Boston College) has revealed that manuscript A and manuscript B both date from the same period, that it is highly probable that both were created at the scriptorium of the abbey of Echternach and that they may even have been produced by the same scribe.

== Conservation and restoration attempt of 1957 ==
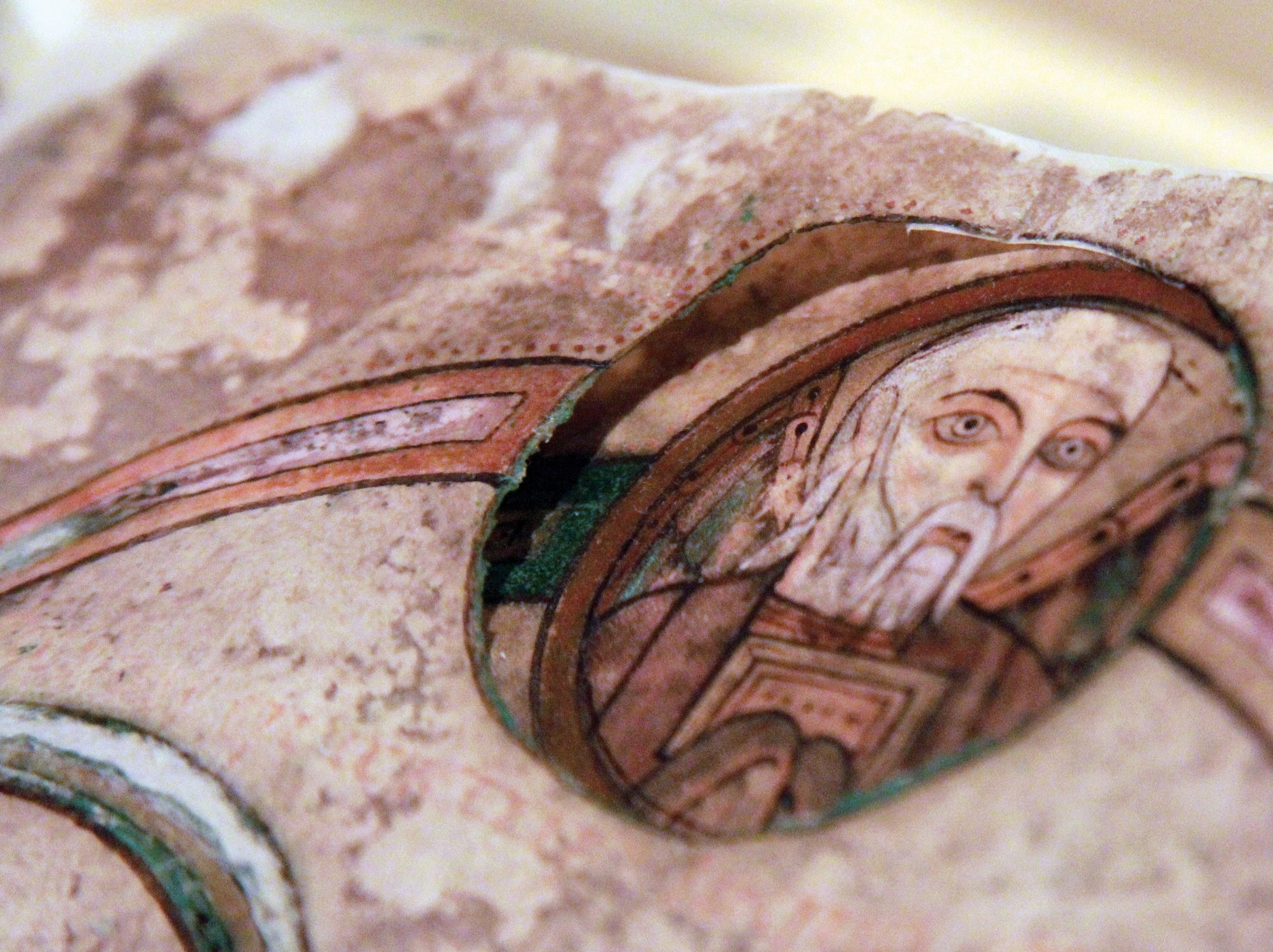
Detail from the Codex B

In 1957, an attempt to conserve and restore the Codex Eyckensis was made by Karl Sievers, a restorer from Düsseldorf. He removed and destroyed the 18th-century red velvet binding and then proceeded to laminate all folios of the manuscript with Mipofolie. Mipofolie is a polyvinyl chloride (PVC) foil, externally plasticized with dioctyl phthalate. With the passing of time, this foil produced hydrochloric acid which attacked the parchment and had a yellowing effect on the foil itself. The transparency and colour of the parchment were affected, and polymers present in the foil could migrate to the parchment and render it brittle. After the lamination, Sievers rebound the codex. To be able to do so, he cut the edges of the folios, which resulted in fragments of the illumination being lost. In a new extensive restoration effort between 1987 and 1993 the Mipofolie lamination was meticulously removed by a team of the Belgian Royal Institute for Cultural Heritage, led by the chemist Dr Jan Wouters. For the restoration of the folios after the removal of the laminate, an innovative parchment leafcasting technique was developed. To complete the restoration, the two constituent manuscripts of the Codex were bound separately.

== Documentation and digitisation ==
The oldest photographic documentation of the Codex Eyckensis dates from approximately 1916 (Bildarchiv Marburg). On the occasion of the restoration, the manuscript was photographed at the Belgian Royal Institute for Cultural Heritage (KIK–IRPA). A facsimile was published in 1994.

In 2015, the Codex Eyckensis was digitised on site in Saint Catherine's church by the Imaging Lab and Illuminare – Centre for the Study of Medieval Art | KU Leuven. This project was led by Prof. Lieve Watteeuw. The high-resolution images were made available on line in cooperation with LIBIS (KU Leuven).

The Codex Eyckensis was recognised and protected as immovable heritage in 1986. In 2003, the Codex Eyckensis was recognised as a Flemish Masterpiece.

== Current research ==
In the course of 2016–2017, a team of researchers from Illuminare – Centre for the Study of Medieval Art | KU Leuven (Prof. Lieve Watteeuw) and the Belgian Royal Institute for Cultural Heritage (Dr. Marina Van Bos) will again study the Codex Eyckensis.

Further information, regularly updated, is available on the websites of the Maaseik Museums, the Book Heritage Lab-KU Leuven, and the Belgian Royal Institute for Cultural Heritage (KIK–IRPA).

== Bibliography ==
- Coenen, J. (1921) Het oudste boek van België, Het Boek 10, pp. 189–194.
- Coppens, C., A. Derolez and H. Heymans (1994) Codex Eyckensis: An Insular Gospel Book from the Abbey of Aldeneik. Antwerp and Maaseik, facsimile.
- De Bruyne, D. (1908) L'évangéliaire du 8e siècle, conservé à Maeseyck, Bulletin de la Société d'Art et d'Histoire du Diocèse de Liège 17, pp. 385–392.
- Dierkens, A. (1979) Evangéliaires et tissus de l’abbaye d’Aldeneik. Aspect historiographique, Miscellanea codicologica F. Masai Dicata (Les publications de Scriptorium 8), Ghent, pp. 31–40.
- Falmagne, T. (2009) Die Echternacher Handschriften bis zum Jahr 1628 in den Beständen der Bibliothèque nationale de Luxembourg sowie Archives diocésaines de Luxembourg, der Archives nationale, der Section historique de l'Institut grand-ducal und des Grand Séminaire de Luxembourg, Wiesbaden, Harrassowitz Verlag, 2 Banden: 311pp. + [64] ill., 792pp.
- Gielen J. (1880) Le plus vieux manuscrit Belge, Journal des Beaux-Arts et de la Littérature 22, no. 15, pp. 114–115.
- Gielen, J. (1891) Evangélaire d'Eyck du VIIIe siècle, Bulletin Koninklijke Commissie voor Kunst en Oudheden 30, pp. 19–28.
- Hendrickx, M. en W. Sangers (1963) De kerkschat der Sint-Catharinakerk te Maaseik. Beschrijvende Inventaris, Limburgs Kunstpatrimonium I, Averbode, pp. 33–35.
- Mersch, B. (1982) Het evangeliarium van Aldeneik, Maaslandse Sprokkelingen 6, pp. 55–79.
- Netzer, N. (1994) Cultural Interplay in the 8th century and the making of a scriptorium. Cambridge, Cambridge University Press, 258pp.
- Nordenfalk, C. (1932) On the age of the earliest Echternach manuscripts, Acta Archeologica, vol. 3, fasc. 1, Copenhagen: Levin & Munksgaard, pp. 57–62.
- Schumacher, R. (1958) L'enluminure d'Echternach: art européen, Les Cahiers luxembourgeois, vol. 30, nr. 6, pp. 181–195.
- Spang, P. (1958) La bibliothèque de l'abbaye d'Echternach, Les Cahiers luxembourgeois, vol. 30, nr. 6, pp. 139–163.
- Talbot, C.H. (1954) The Anglo-Saxon Missionaries in Germany. Being the Lives of SS. Willibrord, Boniface, Sturm, Leoba and Lebuin, together with the Hodoeporicon of St. Willibald and a selection of the Correspondence of Boniface, [vertaald en geannoteerd], Londen-New York, 1954, 234pp.
- Verlinden, C. (1928) Het evangelieboek van Maaseik, Limburg, vol. 11, p. 34.
- Vriens, H. (2016) De Codex Eyckensis, een kerkschat. De waardestelling van een 8ste eeuws Evangeliarium in Maaseik, unpublished M.A. dissertation, KU Leuven.
- Wouters, J., G. Gancedo, A. Peckstadt and L. Watteeuw (1990) The Codex Eyckensis: an illuminated manuscript on parchment from the 8th century: Laboratory investigation and removal of a 30 year old PVC lamination, ICOM triennial meeting. ICOM triennial meeting. Dresden, 26–31 August 1990, Preprints: pp. 495–499.
- Wouters, J., G. Gancedo, A. Peckstadt and L. Watteeuw (1992) The conservation of the Codex Eyckensis: The evolution of the project and the assessment of materials and adhesives for the repair of parchment, The Paper Conservator 16, pp. 67–77.
- Wouters, J., A. Peckstadt and L. Watteeuw (1995) Leafcasting with dermal tissue preparations: a new method for repairing fragile parchment and its application to the Codex Eyckensis, The Paper Conservator 19, pp. 5–22.
- Wouters, J., L. Watteeuw and A. Peckstadt (1996) The conservation of parchment manuscripts: two case studies, ICOM triennial meeting, ICOM triennial meeting. Edinburgh, 1–6 September 1996, London, James & James, pp. 529–544.
- Wouters, J., B. Rigoli, A. Peckstadt and L. Watteeuw (1997) Un matériel nouveau pour le traitement de parchemins fragiles, Techné: Journal of the Society for Philosophy and Technology, 5, pp. 89–96.
- Zimmerman, E.H. (1916) Vorkarolingische Miniaturen, Deutscher Verein für Kunstwissenschaft III, Sektion, Malerei, I. Abteilung, Berlin, pp. 66–67; 128; 142–143, 303–304.
