= Aldeneik =

Village in Flemish Region, Belgium

- Village
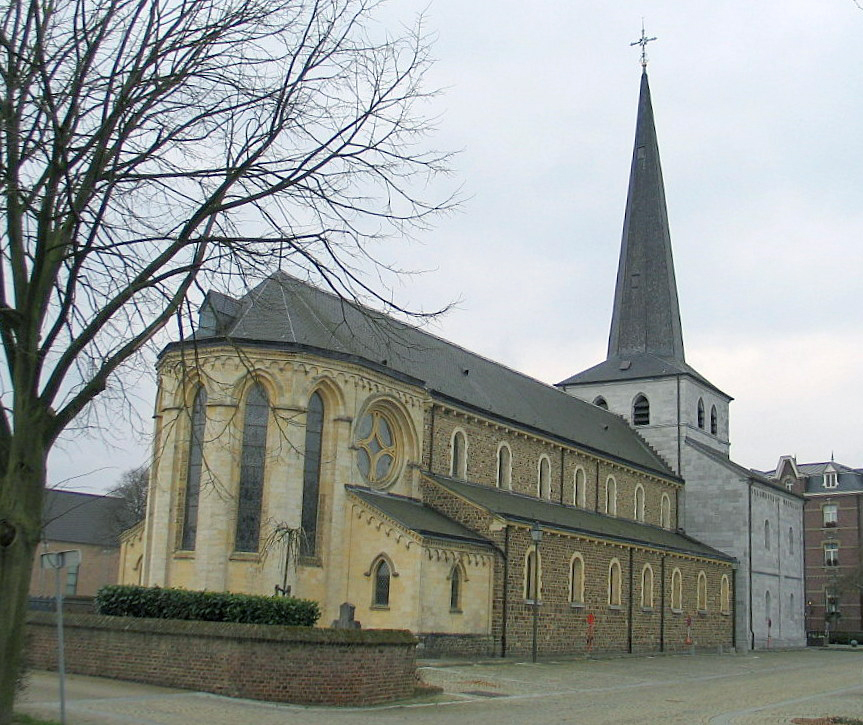
- St Anna Church

- Location in Belgium
- Coordinates: 51°6′10″N 5°48′19″E
- Country: Belgium
- Region: Flemish Region
- Province: Limburg
- Municipality: Maaseik

Area
  - Total: 4.81 km^{2} (1.86 sq mi)

Population (2021)
  - Total: 1,401
  - Density: 291/km^{2} (754/sq mi)
- Time zone: CET

Aldeneik, founded in 730, is a suburb of the Belgian town of Maaseik. It lies on the left bank of the river Meuse, close to the border with the Netherlands, close to where the Bosbeek runs off it. According to legend it sprung up around a monastery set up by the Frankish sisters Herlindis and Relindis, who wrote the Gospel book known as the Codex Eyckensis, still in Maaseik. The settlement contains the Romanesque and Gothic Sint-Annakerk.

== Foundation legends ==
=== Devil ===
The Devil saw the sisters writing the Codex and could do nothing to stop them, until he had the idea of blowing out their candles. However, an angel came and re-lit them.

== Gallery ==
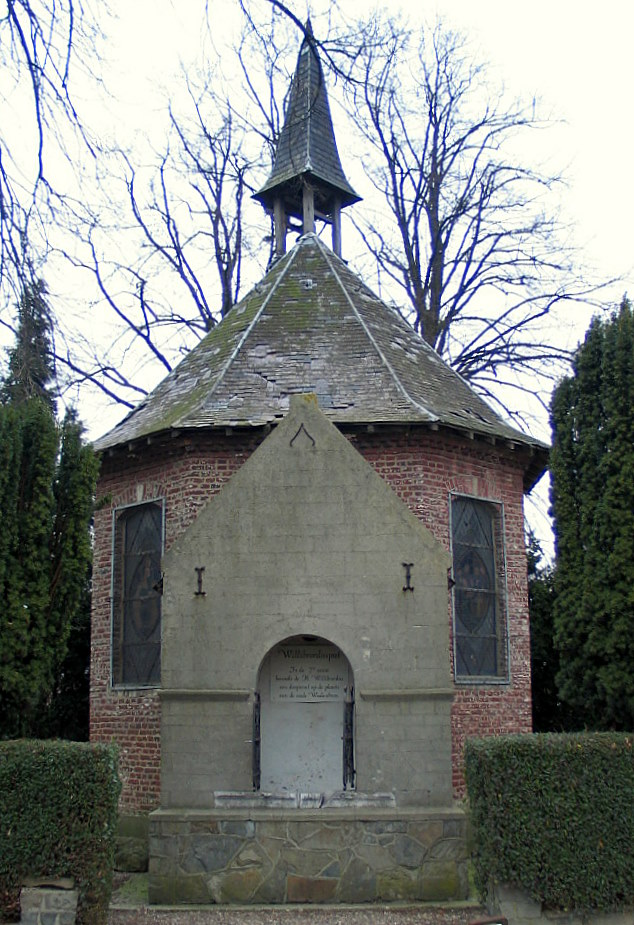
7th century baptistery built by Willibrord on the site of a shrine to Wōden

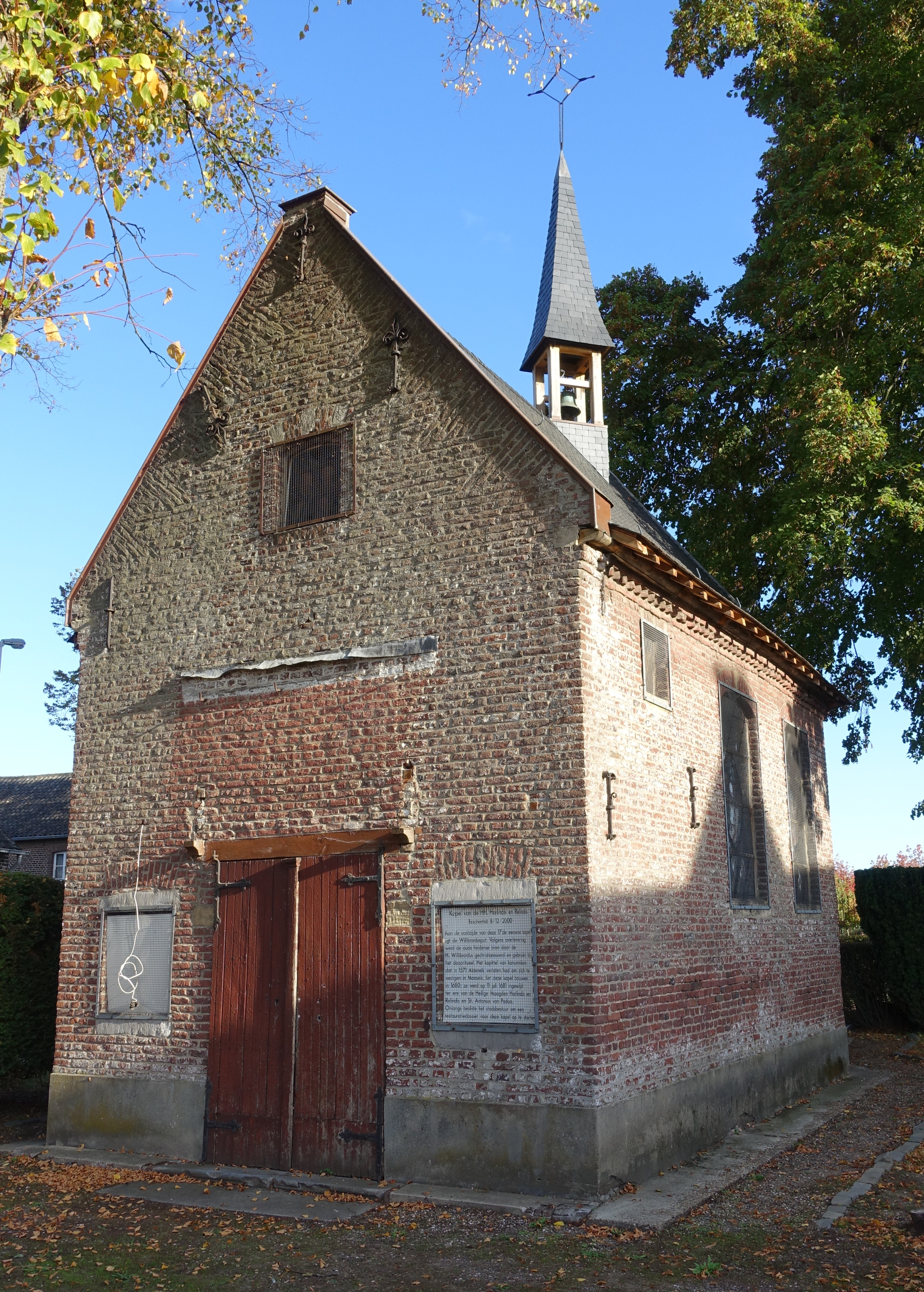
The chapel (ca. 2018) in Aldeneik, consecrated by Herlindis and Relindis

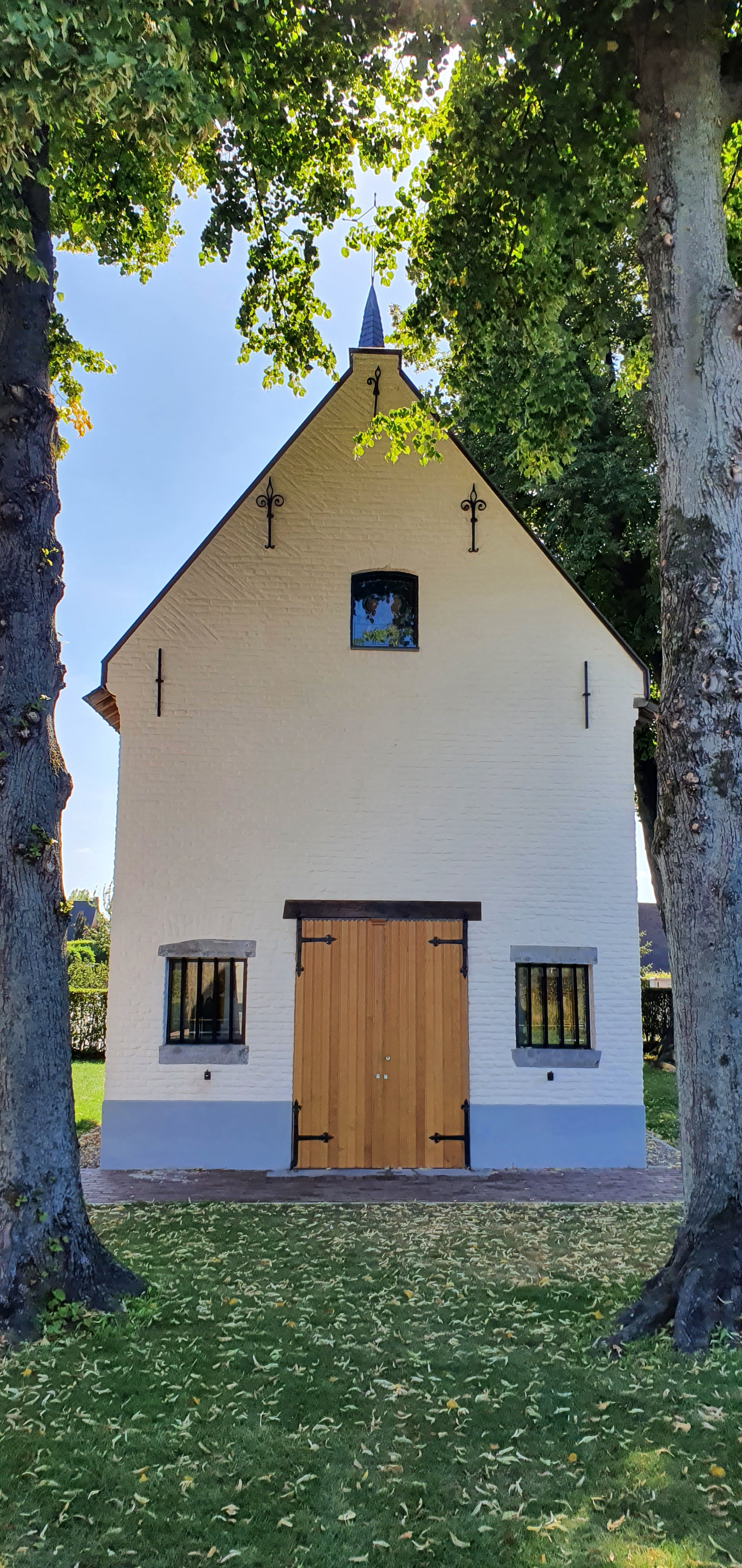
The chapel in August 2022
