= Alexander Casteels the Younger =

Flemish artist

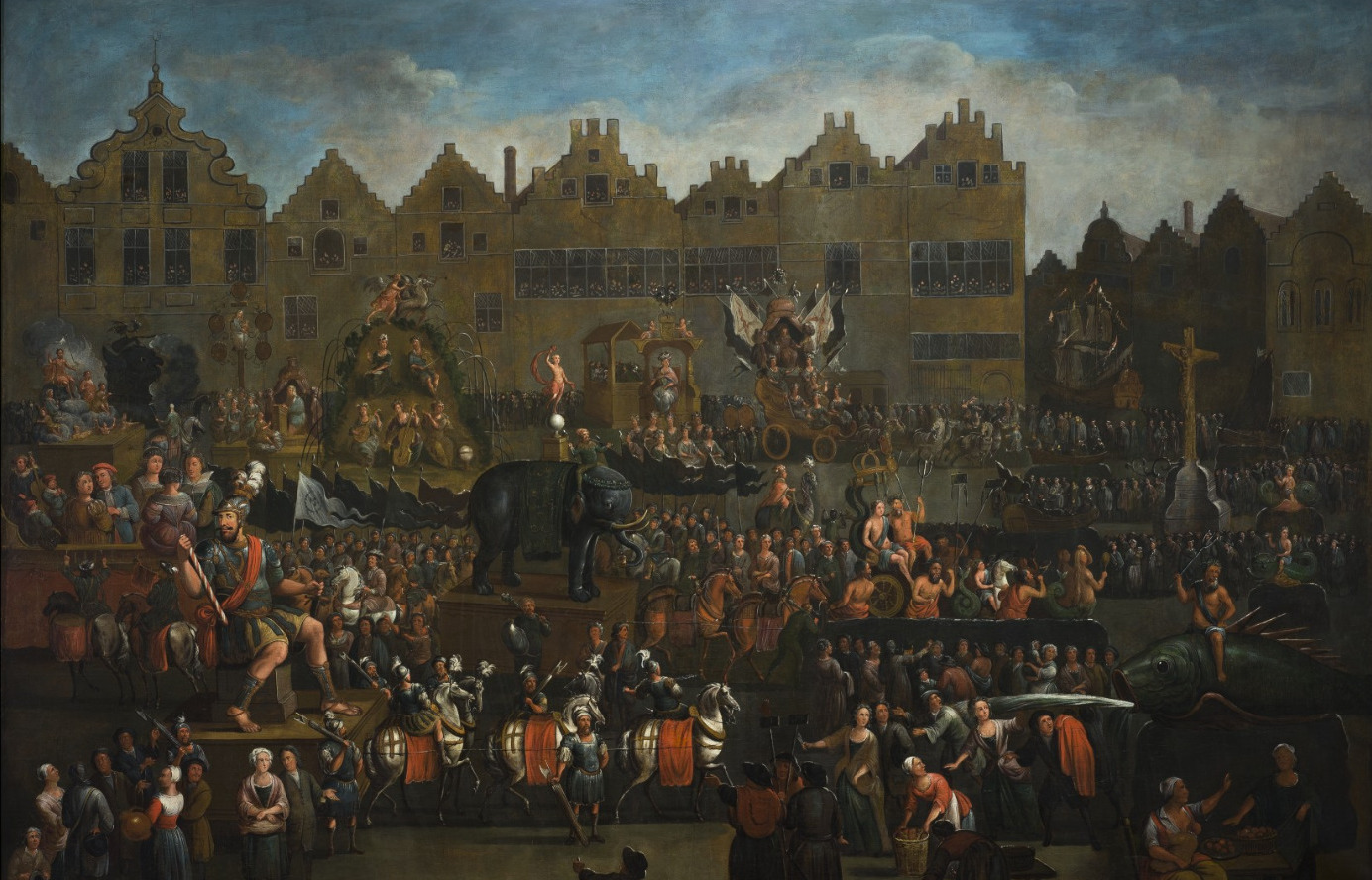
The Ommegang on the Meir in Antwerp

Alexander Casteels the Younger or Alexander Casteels (II) (Antwerp, 1645/1665 – 1716 or later) was a Flemish painter, illuminator and draughtsman. He is known for watercolor paintings of interiors of churches and chapels in Antwerp and a scene depicting the Ommegang on the Meir in Antwerp.

== Life ==
Casteels was born in Antwerp sometime from 1645 to 1665. He was admitted as a ‘wijnmeester’ (‘wine master’, meaning a son of a master) in the discipline of illuminator in the Antwerp Guild of St. Luke in the guild year 1687–1688. He remained a member of the Guild until 1716. Peeter de Loos was his pupil in the guild year 1694–1695.

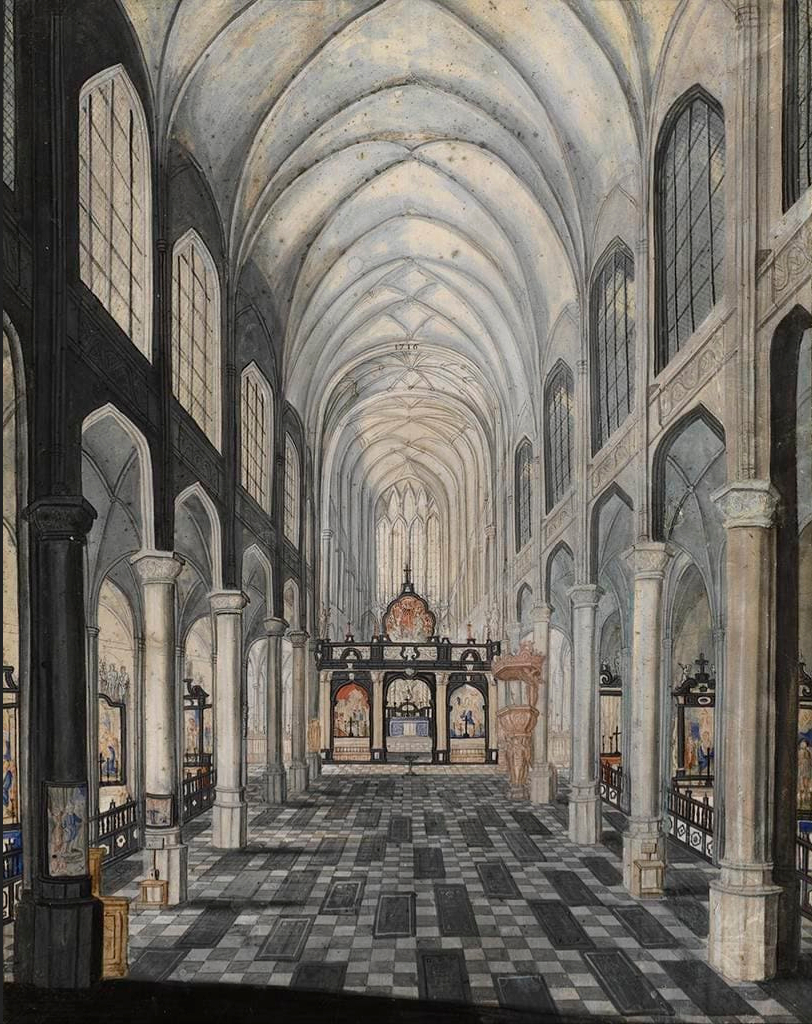
Interior of the St. James Church in Antwerp

It is not recorded when or where he died. It must have been in or after 1716 as there is a work of him dated to 1716.

== Work ==
Only a few works are attributed to Casteels. There are five works, all in watercolor on paper, that depict interiors of chapels and churches in Antwerp. Only two works are dated. The first is dated 1710 and shows an Interior view of the small Gothic St Anne chapel in de Keizerstraat in Antwerp. This work is located in the chapel itself and shows the altarpiece that now no longer hangs in the chapel. The second work represents the Interior of the James' Church of Antwerp. A third work depicts the Interior of the chapel of the Jesuit college in the Hof van Liere (Rhode Island School of Design Museum) in the Prinsstraat in Antwerp. In the St. Charles Borromeo Church, Antwerp hangs an undated interior view of that church without figures. Casteels also depicted the interior of the Cathedral of Our Lady, but the location of this work is unknown. Because of their naive style, these works of Casteels lean more towards folk art than fine art. They are not of a very high painterly quality but serve as interesting documentation about these buildings that are still in existence in Antwerp.

Casteels is likely the author of The Ommegang on the Meir in Antwerp (Museum aan de Stroom), which appears to be a copy after the engraving made by the Antwerp engraver Gaspar Bouttats in 1685.
