= Church of Saint Anne, Aldeneik =

Church in Flemish Region, Belgium

Coordinates: 51°6′7.3″N 5°48′20″E

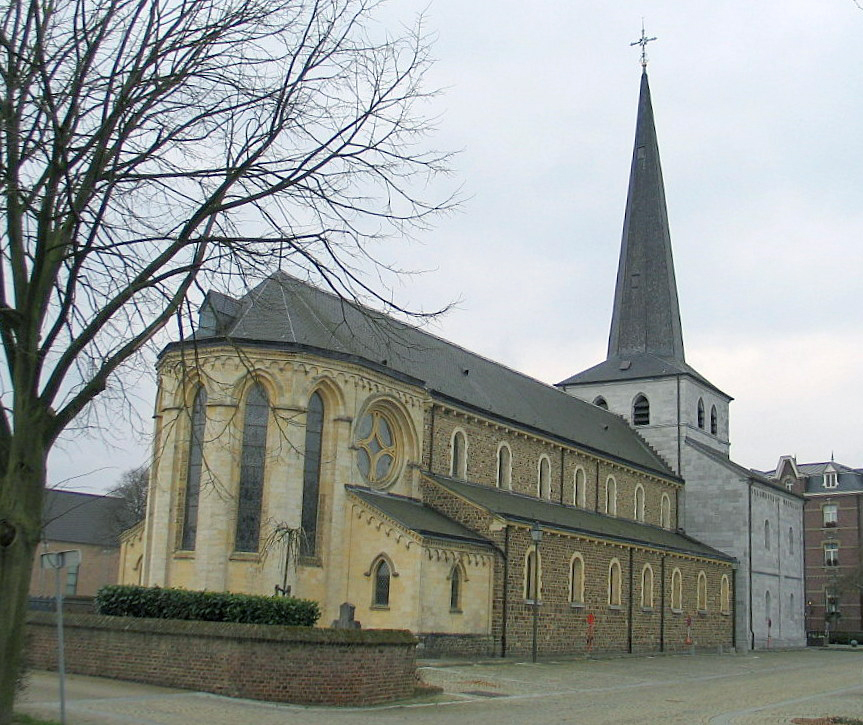
Church of Saint Anne, Aldeneik

The Church of Saint Anne (Dutch: Sint-Annakerk) is a partly Romanesque, partly Gothic church in Aldeneik, Belgium.

== History ==
Originally, the church was part of Aldeneik Abbey, a Benedictine nunnery, founded by the holy sisters Harlindis and Relindis on their father Adelard's estate in Eike (Aldeneik). In the 10th century, emperor Otto I donated the monastery to the Prince-Bishopric of Liège in order to prevent local nobleman from seizing control of the property. Shortly afterwards the nunnery was replaced by a collegiate chapter of (male) canons, who in the 12th century built the Romanesque church which partly survives in the present building. Since the 16th century it has served as a Roman Catholic parish church. Originally dedicated to Saint Mary, later to Mary and Saint Peter, in the 18th century it was dedicated to Saint Anne.

== Description church ==
=== Exterior ===
The present church was partly built in the 12th century and consists of a 3-aisle basilica in Mosan style, without transepts. In the 13th or 14th century the choir was replaced in Gothic style. After the chapter moved to Maaseik in 1571, the church became too big for the small congregation that continued to use it. The aisles were probably demolished shortly afterwards. Part of the westwork was also demolished or destroyed. In the 19th century the westwork was rebuilt, although it was not clear what the original westwork had looked like. The side aisles were rebuilt in the same period.

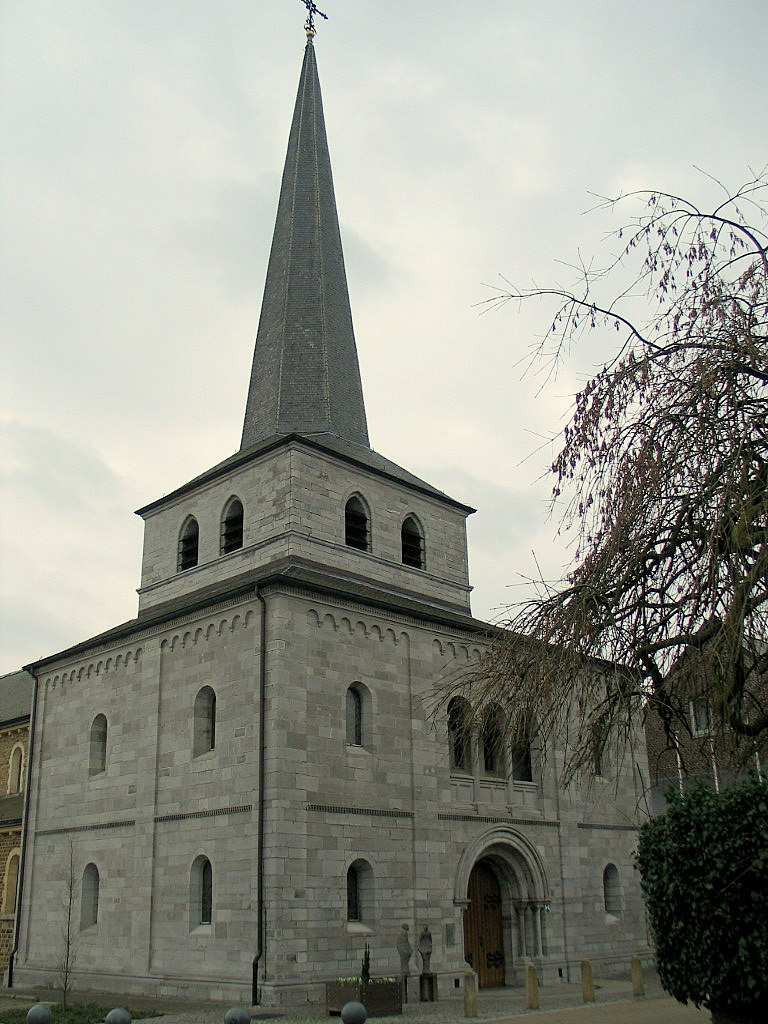
Westwork and tower

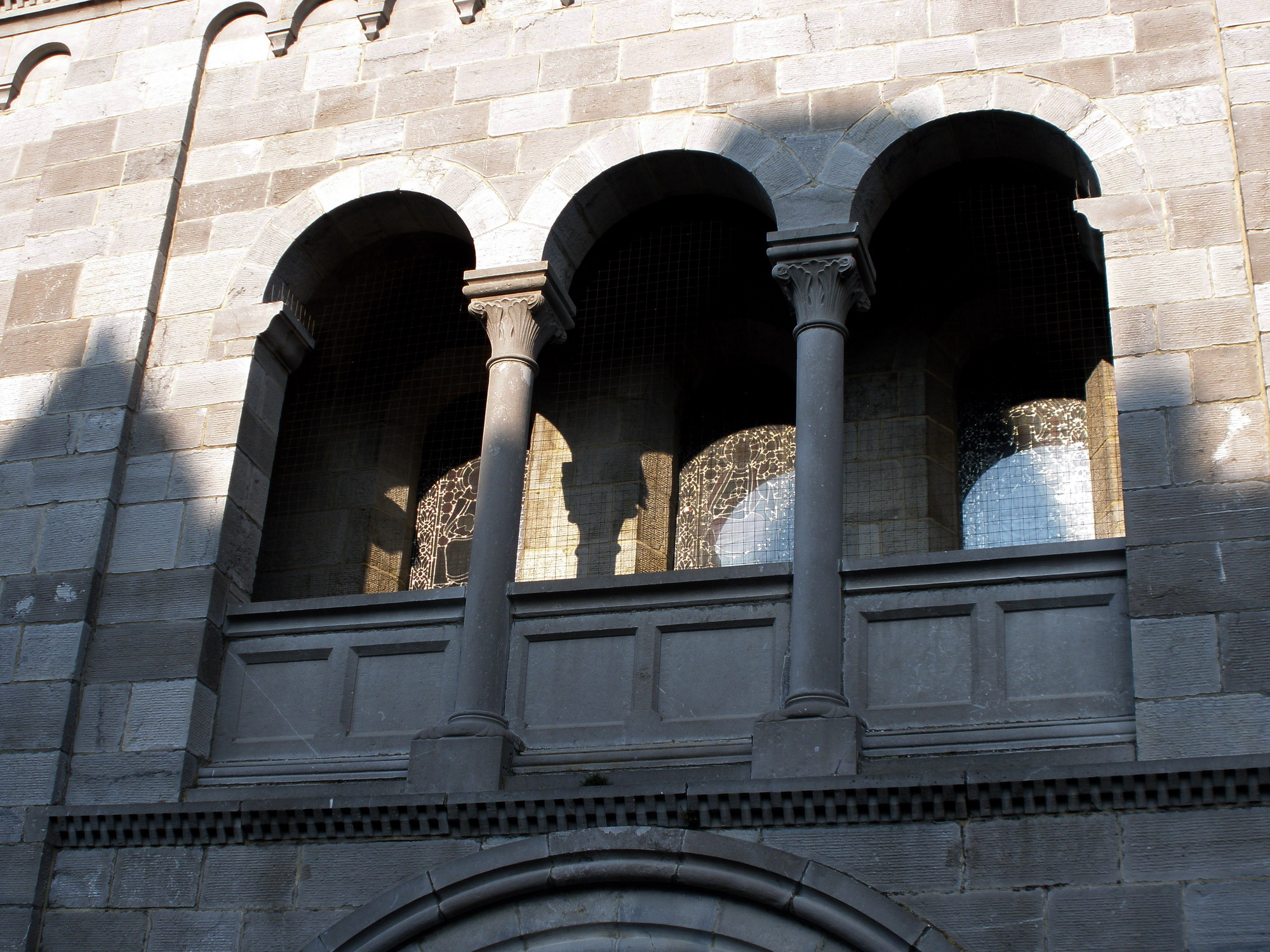
Dwarf gallery

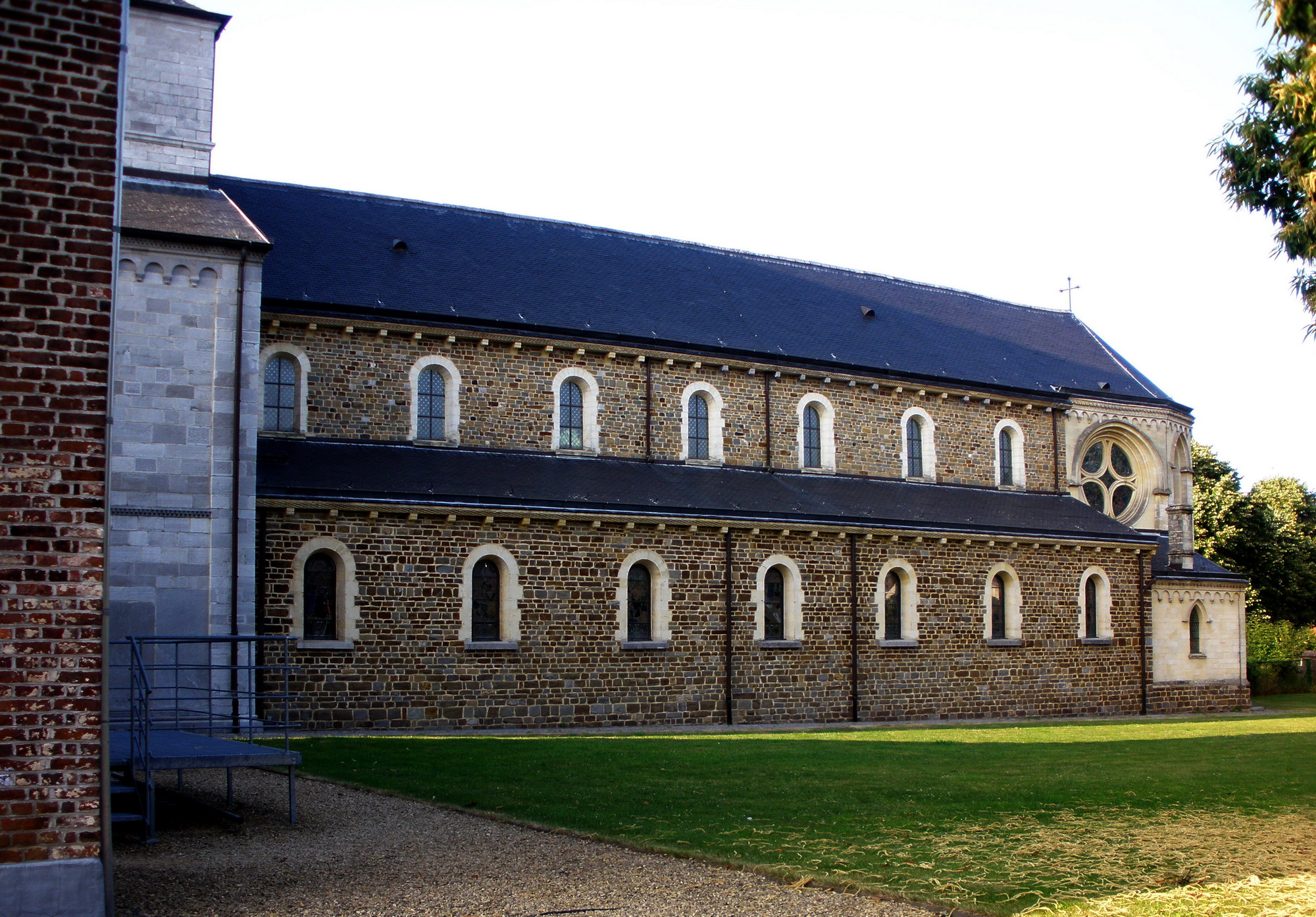
View from the north

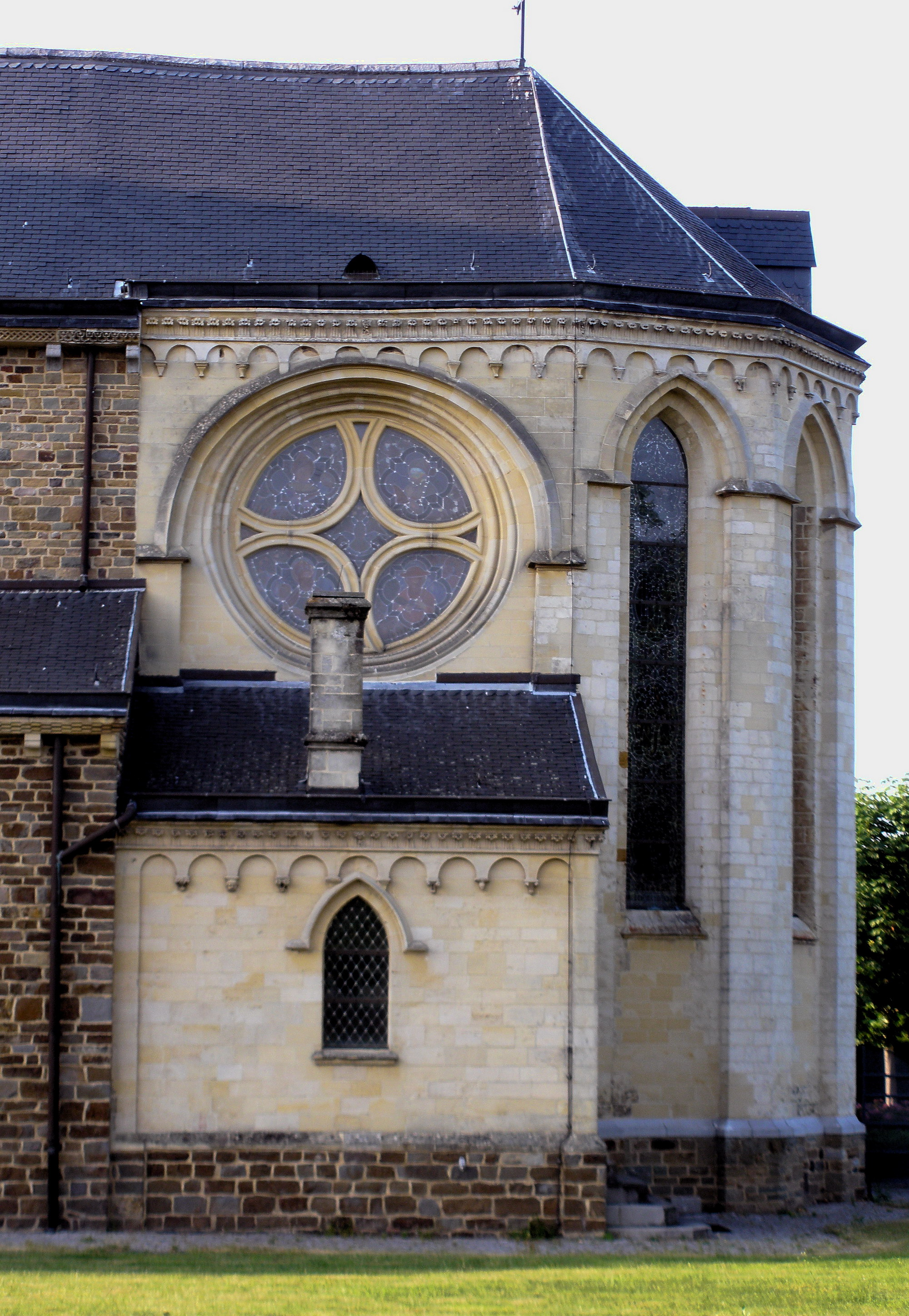
Choir and rose window

=== Interior ===
The nave is the best preserved part of the original interior of the church, although the wooden ceiling was renewed in the 19th century. The primitive red and ochre murals in the nave date from the 13th century and are among the oldest in Belgium. The choir is lit by two rose windows and five lancet windows.

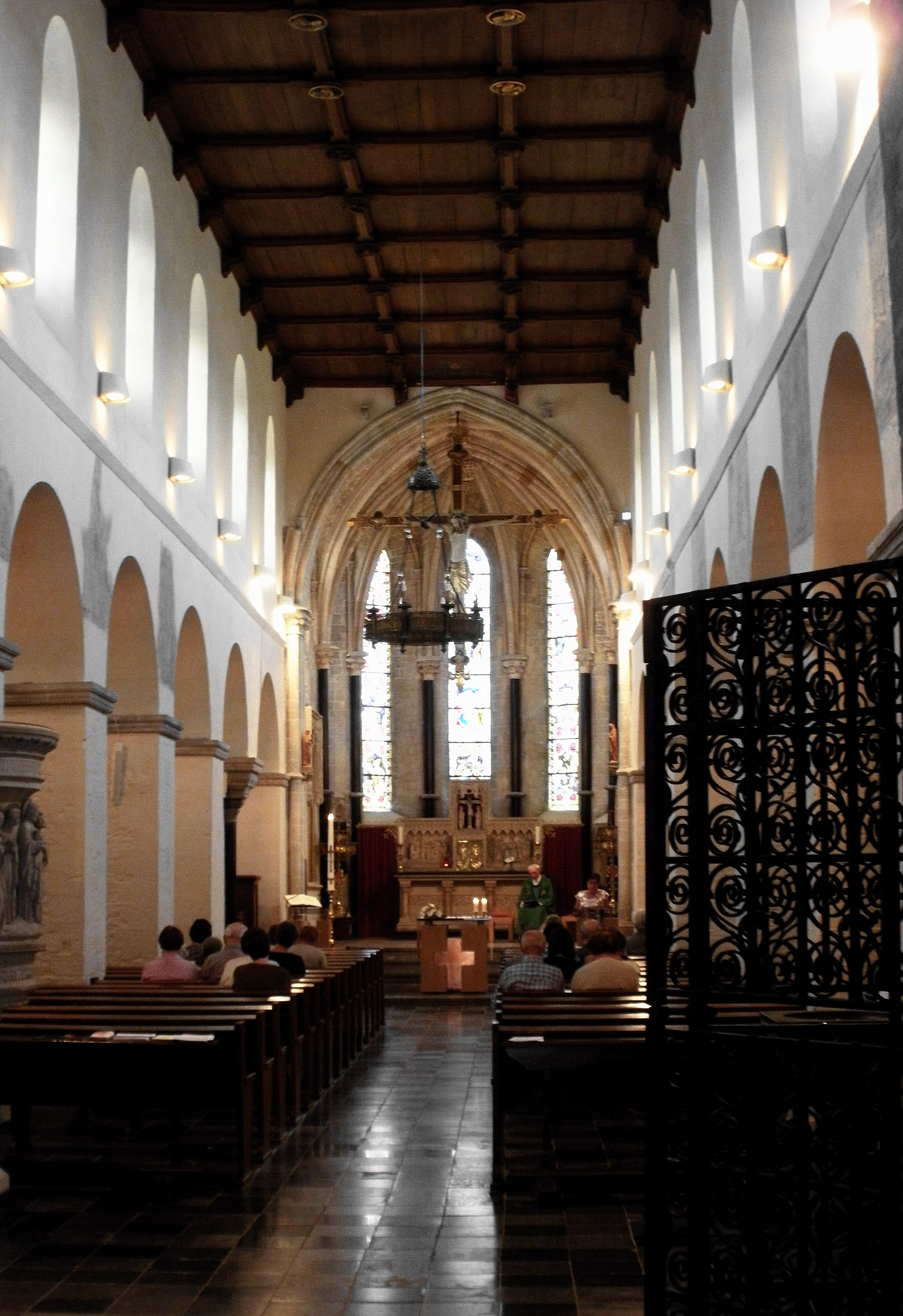
View towards the choir

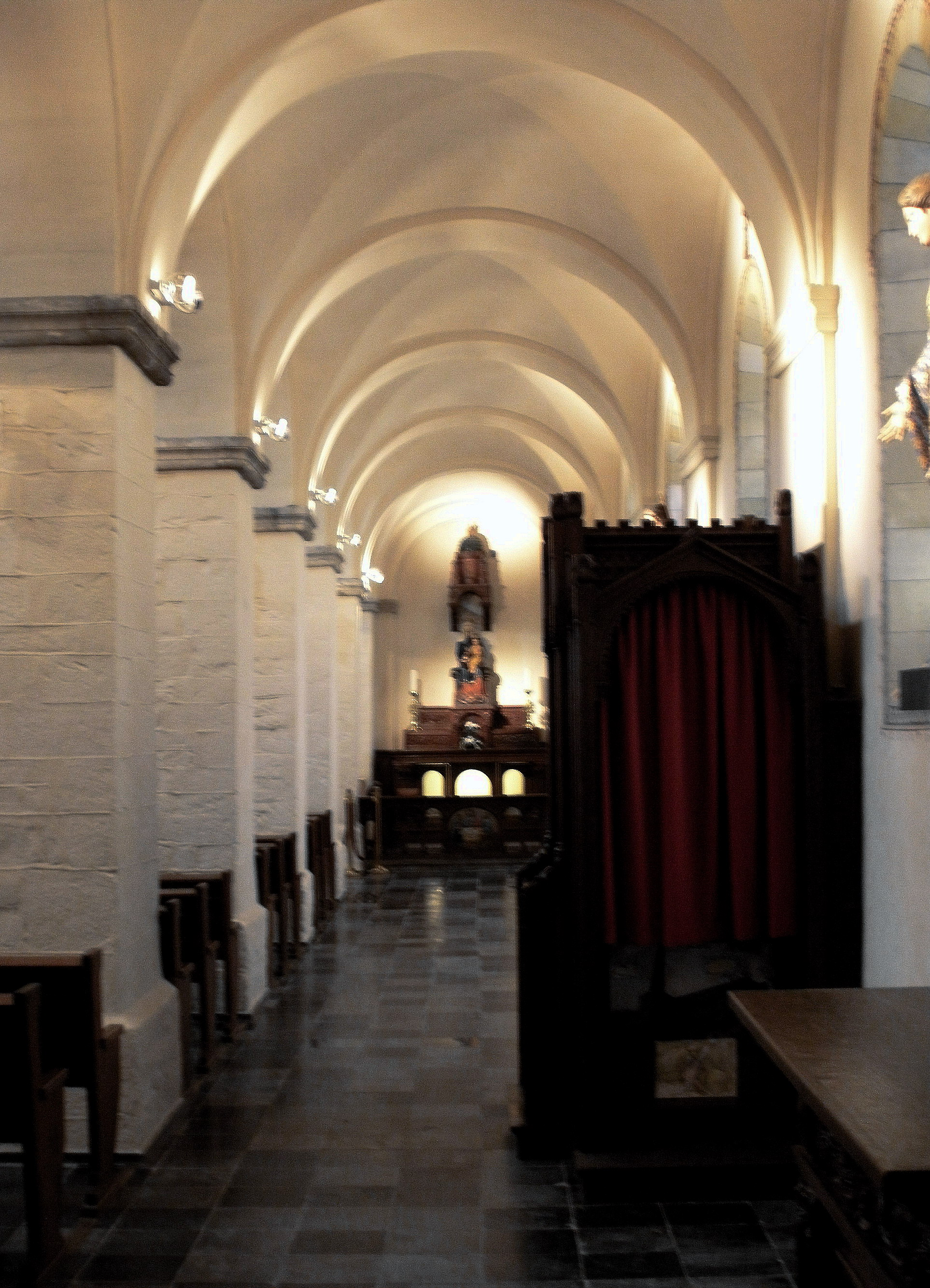
North aisle

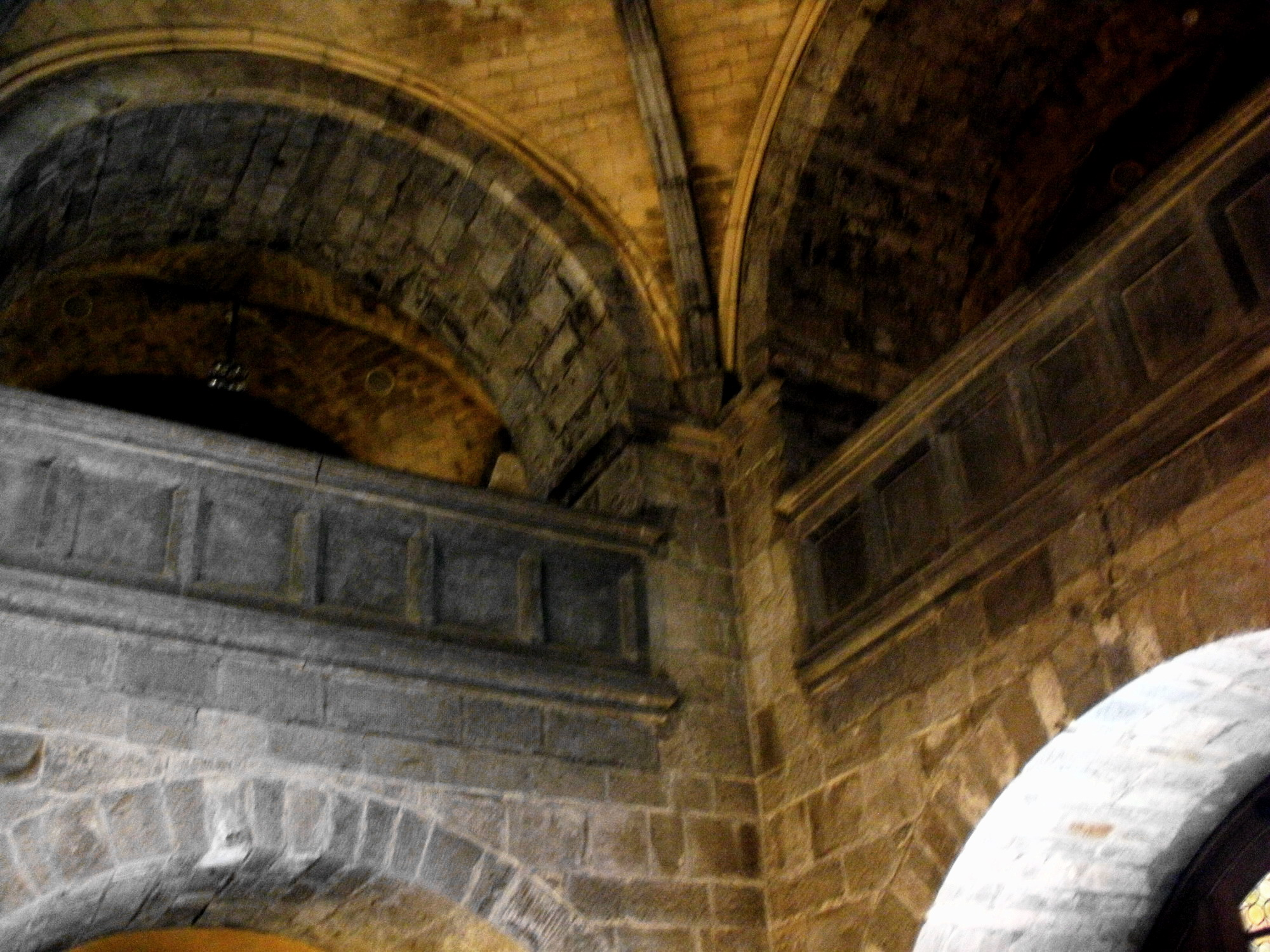
Interior westwork

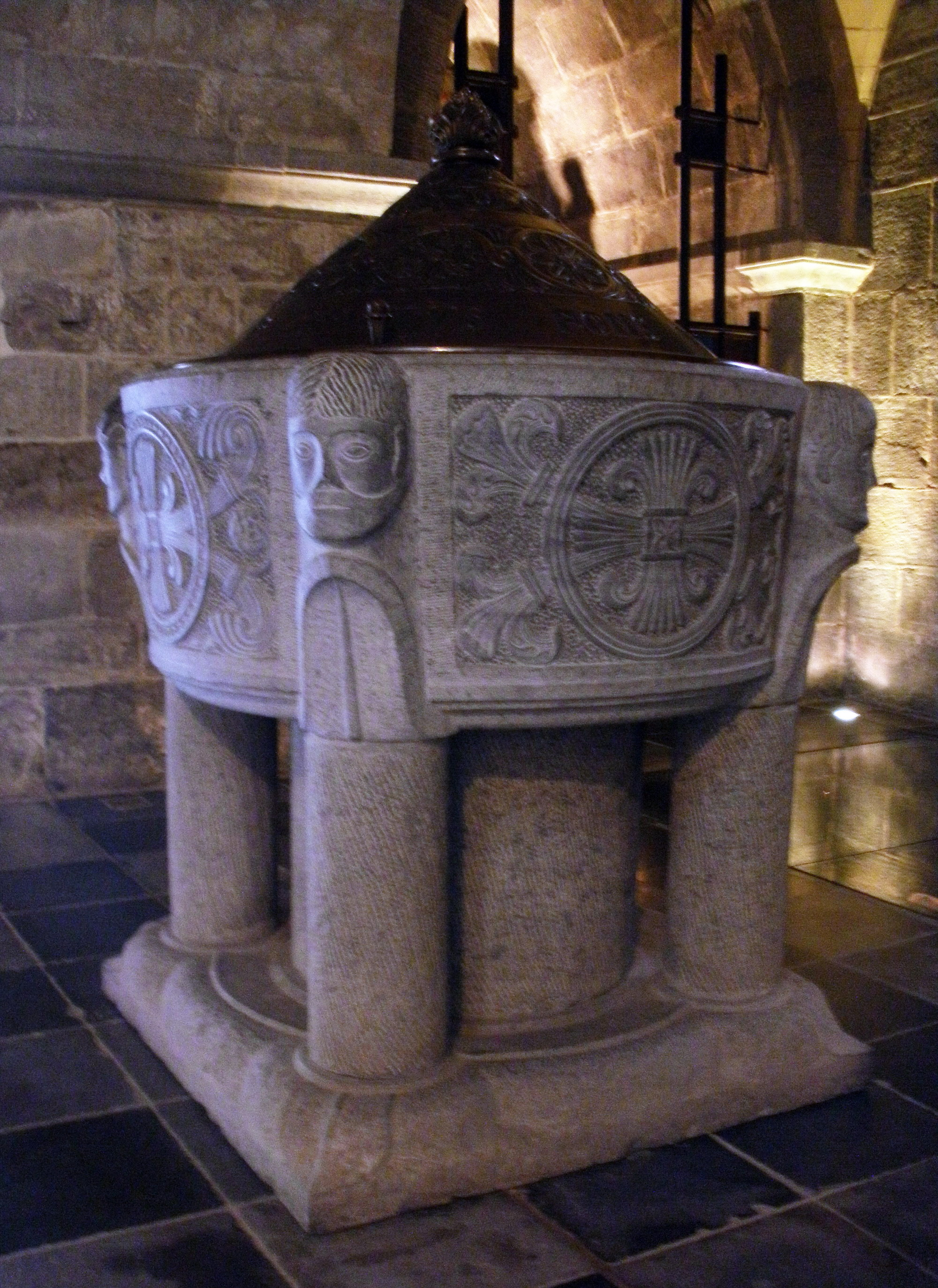
Romanesque font
