= Relindis of Maaseik =

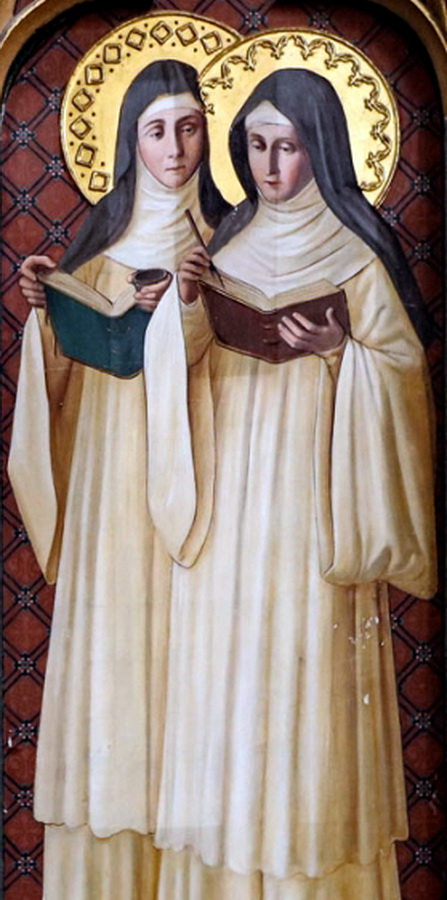
Harlinde & Relinde murals, St. Paul's Cathedral, Liège, Belgium.

Saint Relindis (or Renule) (died 750), sister of Saint Herlindis, was the daughter of count Adelard. The sisters were brought up at the Benedictine monastery in Valenciennes. Adelard and his wife later built a monastery at Maaseik for their daughters. The Abbey of Aldeneik was consecrated in 728.

Willibrord consecrated Harlindis as the first abbess, After her death, Relindis was named to succeed her by Saint Boniface.

Relindus was gifted in embroidery and painting. The purported vestments of Sts. Harlindis and Relindis, now in Maaseik, Belgium are the earliest surviving examples of Anglo-Saxon embroidery. Traditionally attributed as the work of Sts. Harlindis and Relindis themselves, the works are not that old and are of Anglo-Saxon English origin, dated to the second half of the ninth century.

== Veneration ==
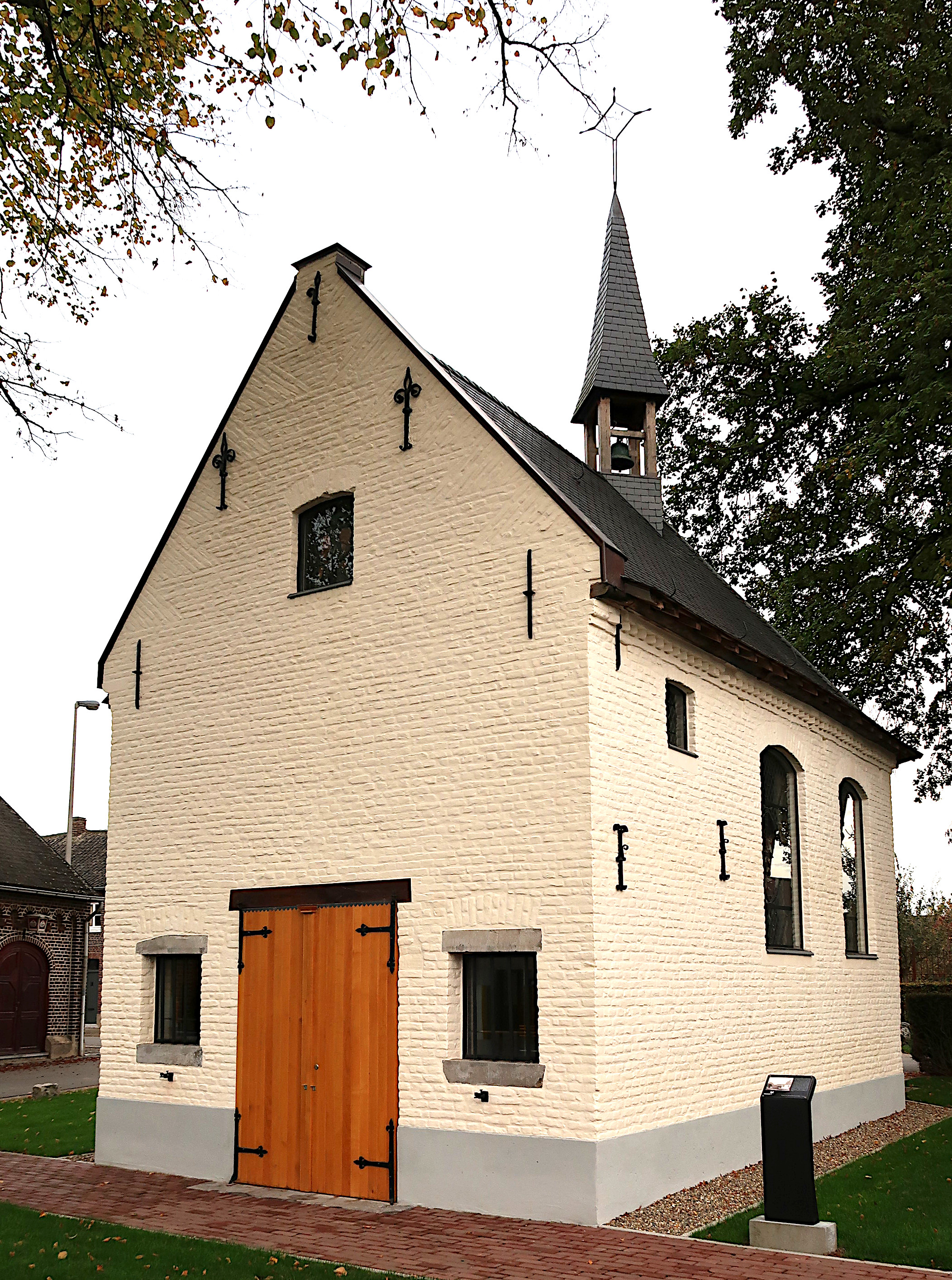
Sint-Harlindis en Relindiskapel Aldeneik, Maaseik

Veneration of Saints Harlindis and Relindis became widespread throughout the diocese of Liège. Her feast day is 6 February. An Ommegang is held every twenty-five years to commemorate the transfer of their relics from Sint-Anna Church in Aldeneik to Sint-Catharinakerk in Maaseik. The most recent was held in 2022.
