= Herlindis of Maaseik =

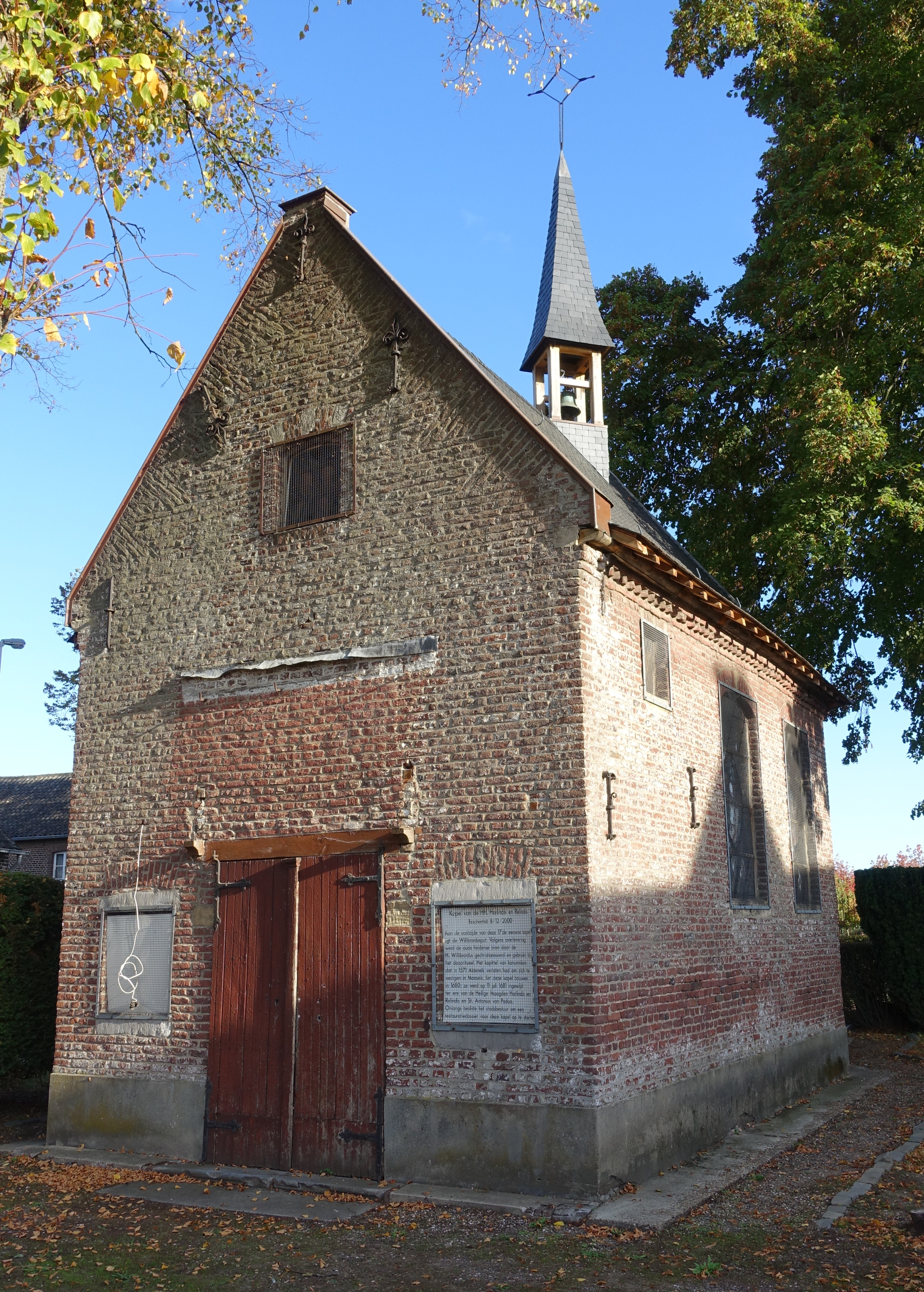
Chapel in Aldeneik, dedicated to Herlindis and Relindis

Saint Herlindis (or Harlindis) (c.695 in Maaseik – 745 or 753 in Aldeneik, near Maaseik), sister of Saint Relindis, was a Frankish saint and abbess.

== Life ==
Herlindis and Relindis were the daughters of the Frankish nobleman Adelard, who had his daughters brought up at the Benedictine monastery in Valenciennes. In 730 Herlindis's parents set up a Benedictine monastery at Aldeneik for his daughters. Herlindis was consecrated as its first abbess by Willibrord, and held the role until her death, after which Relindis was named to succeed her by Saint Boniface.

The two sisters are usually portrayed together, sometimes also with a few nuns, holding either an abbess's staff or a model of the monastery. Her feast day is 12 October, or on 13 February in Liège (on the same day as Relindis).

== Casula of Saints Harlindis and Relindis ==
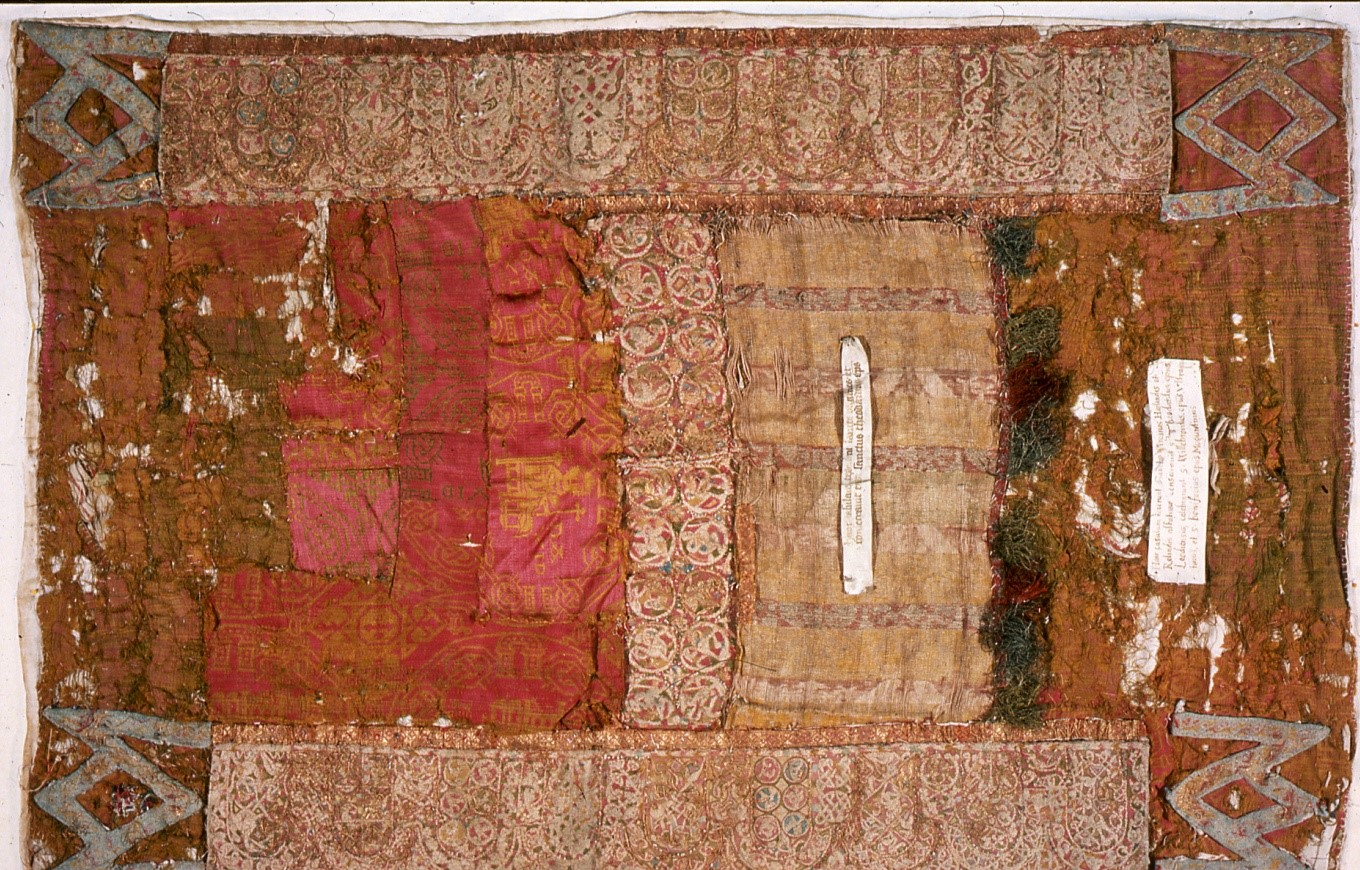
The full casula

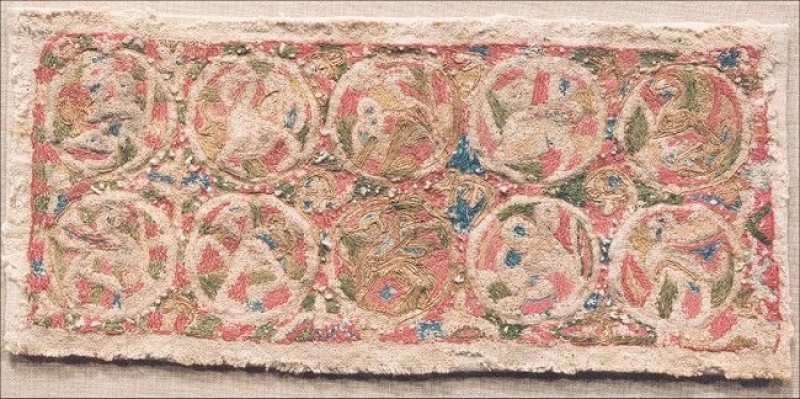
Detail of the casula embroidery

=== History ===
The Casula of Saints Harlindis and Relindis (also known as the Casula of Maasik or the Maasik embroideries) is the earliest extant example of large-scale embroidery from England. It dates from the late 8th or 9th century and was found in Aldeneik Abbey, in Belgium. It is richly decorated in elaborate embroideries of silk and metal thread on a linen base. The casula was not made by the saints themselves, though for centuries it was thought that Harlindis and Relindis made it. Embroidery was seen as an important way to show high social status, and people who could produce it were highly regarded. This is likely why the embroideries came to be associated with the saints, rather than just with the church. Based on analysis of the embroidery style and garment, it most likely dates from after these saints lived so would have had to have been embroidered by someone else. The embroideries were, however, all made at the same time and in the same workshop, though the casula itself has undergone many changes and alterations since it was first made.

In the 8th and 9th centuries, cassocks were shaped garments. While this one is rectangular, it looks like it was altered at some point. It was likely altered to be a more modern shape, and may not have been a cassock when it was first created. Originally it was also richly embellished with pearls, and some of the stitching and stitch holes remain. There is a reference to the pearls still being attached in 1647, so they were on the cassock until at least that point in time.

=== Embroidery and decorations ===
The metal embroidery thread in the cassock was made by wrapping gold filament around a horse or cow hair core. This would have been extremely costly and time consuming to create, but this sort of labor was typical for creating vestments. The embroidery completely covers the linen it is embroidered on, as was usual for embroideries at this time. While this is the earliest embroidery found on this scale, it is typical of the art style representative at the time. This is known as the Trewhiddle style of art, which can be seen in the manuscripts and metalwork contemporary to the embroidery. It is known for its dense patterns, swirls, roundels, and intertwined animal motifs. It is also seen famously in the Book of Kells, but was popular in metalwork as well as in other manuscripts. It is likely that this style of artwork is replicating embroidery, as it is based heavily on interlocking motifs.

The tablet woven bands edging the casula are similar to Norse ones found in Birka. The bands are made of silk and linen threads like the Birka ones, however they are believed to have been made in England. They are the first tablet-woven bands found to use the gold-wrapped embroidery threads rather than just silk, linen, or wool.

== See also ==
- Sint-Annakerk (Aldeneik)
