= Mosan art =

Regional style of art from the Meuse river valley

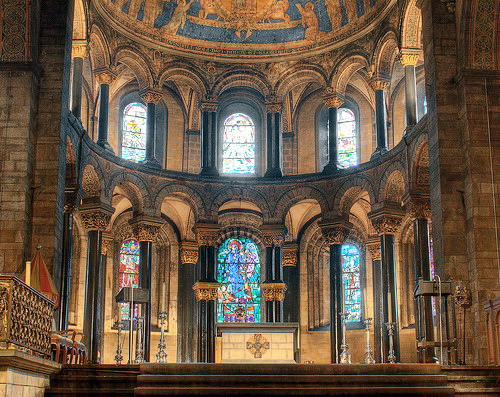
Maastricht, Basilica of Our Lady. East choir with carved capitals (12th century)

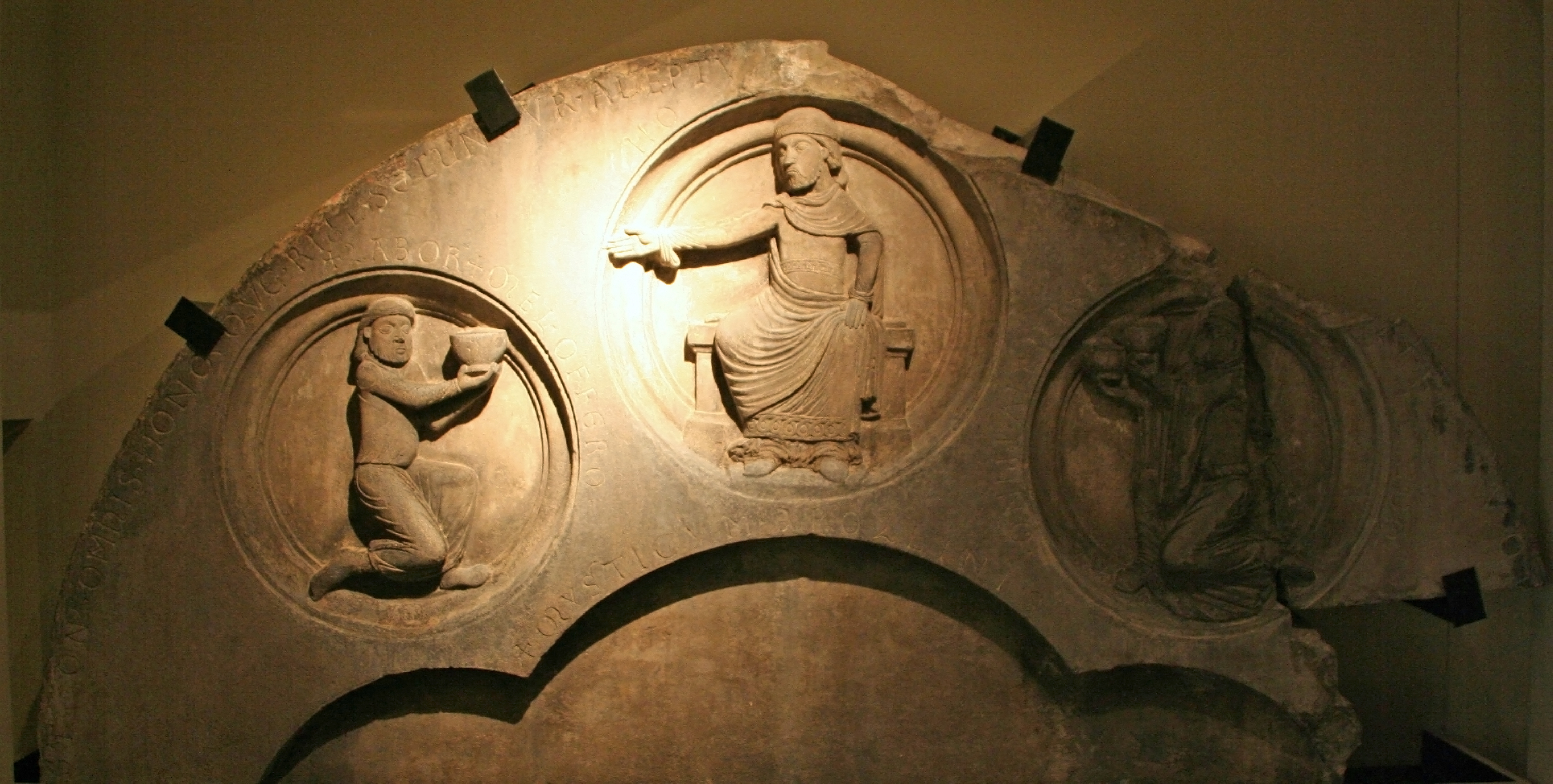
Curtius Museum, Liège. Pierre Boudon or Apollo relief (12th century)

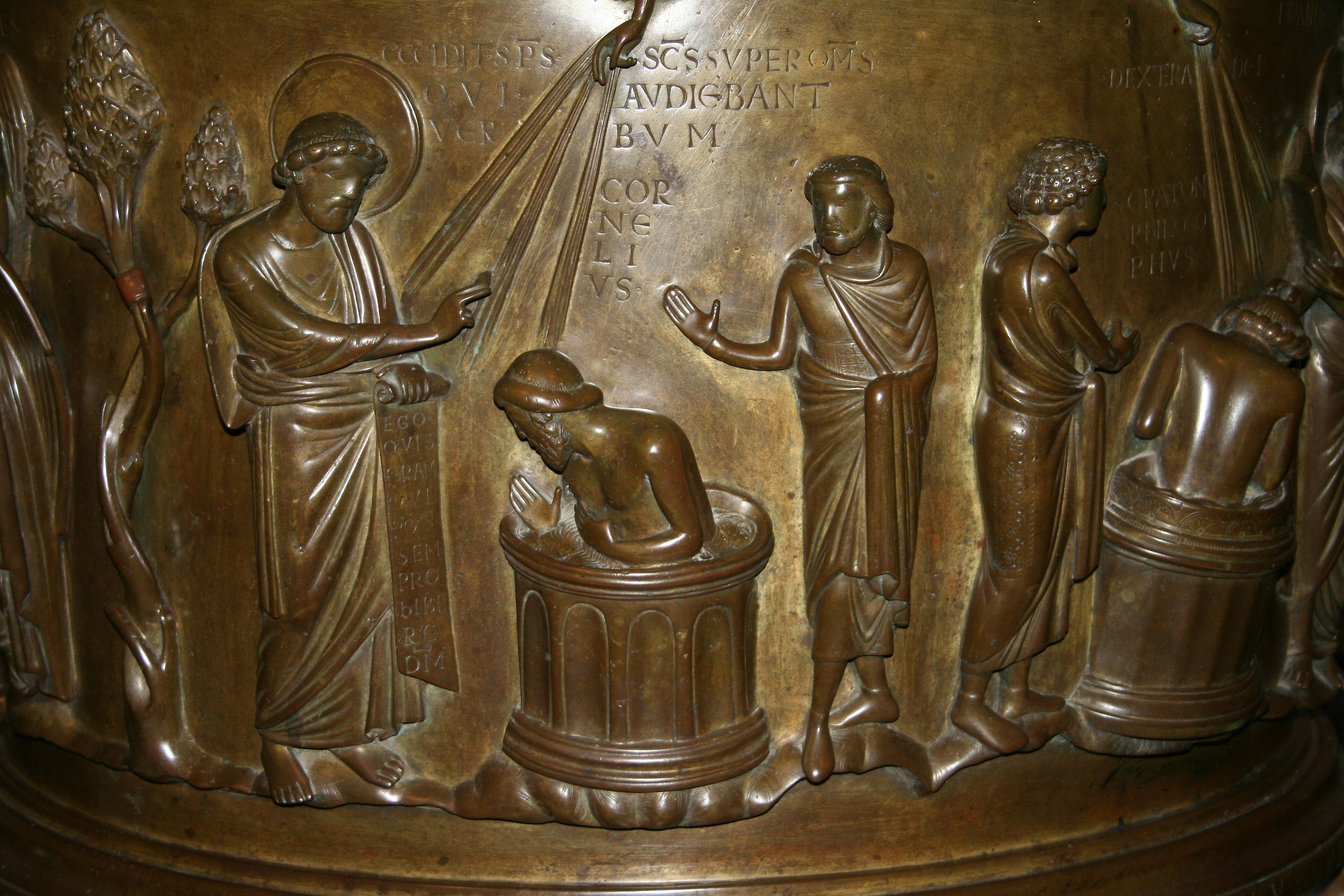
Liège, St Bartholomew's Church. Baptismal font by Renier de Huy (detail)

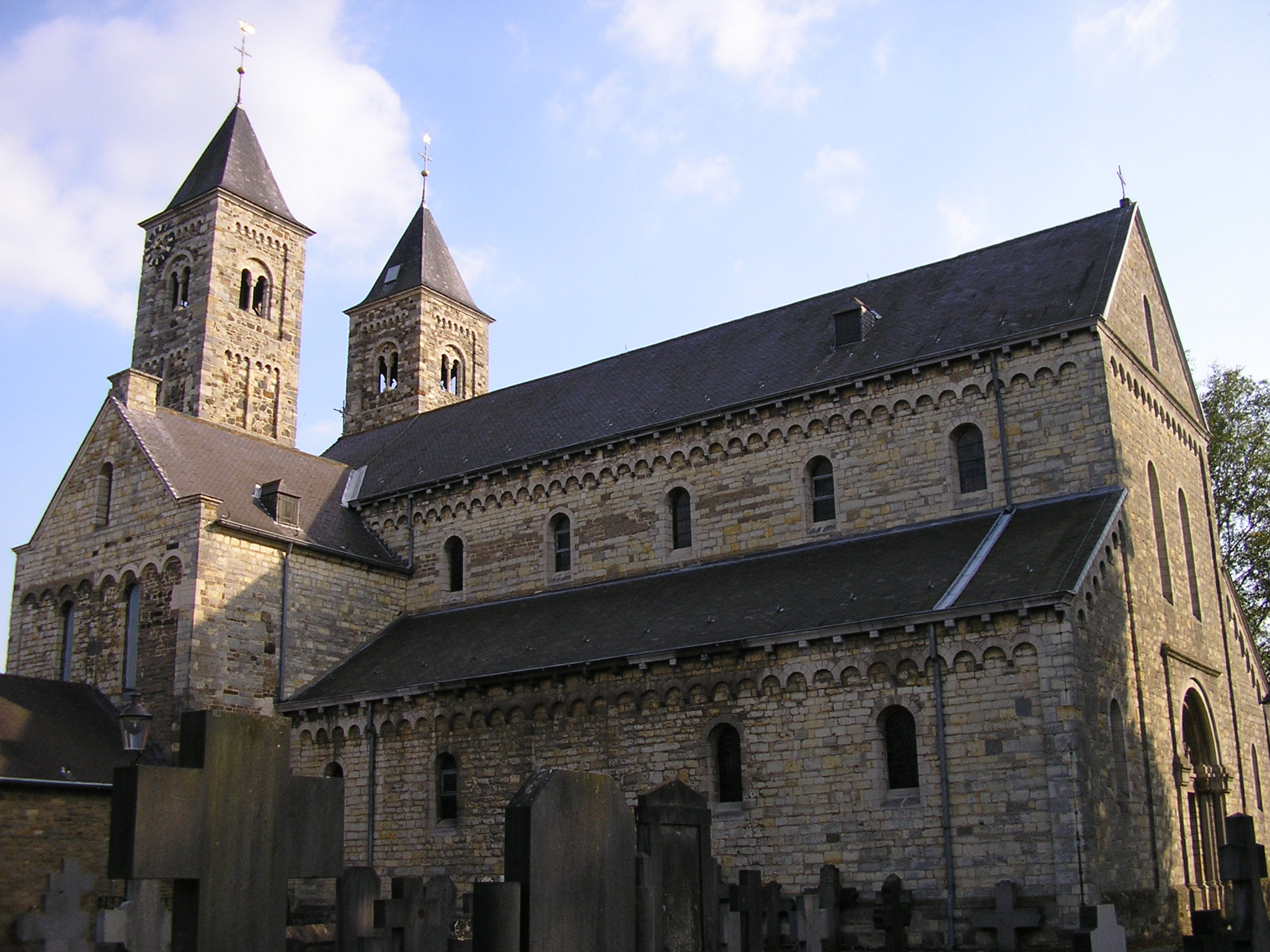
Sint Odiliënberg. Basilica of Saint Wiro, Plechelmus and Otgerus

Mosan art is a regional style of art from the valley of the Meuse in present-day Belgium, the Netherlands, and Germany. Although in a broader sense the term applies to art from this region from all periods, it generally refers to Romanesque art, with Mosan Romanesque architecture, stone carving, metalwork, enamelling and manuscript illumination reaching a high level of development during the 11th, 12th and 13th centuries.

The Meuse river valley lay in the heart of the earlier Carolingian Empire and therefore the style draws largely from the heritage of the Carolingian art tradition. Thus, Mosan art contains strong classical elements, which separates it from the international Romanesque style seen elsewhere during the period, for example in France, Germany Spain and Italy. However, it shares with mainstream Romanesque art elements such as the treatment of space. Although the iconography of 11th- and 12th-century Meuse valley art largely draws on Biblical inspiration, some of the elaborately carved capitals in the two main churches in Maastricht depict scenes from many aspects of daily life, as well as images from an intriguing world of fantasy.

== Geographical spread ==
The Mosan region was formed largely by the boundary of the Bishopric of Liège, which had strong political links to the emperors of the Holy Roman Empire, as well as to the bishops of Cologne. The region's main artistic centres were the cities of Liège, Huy, Dinant, Namur, Tongeren, Maastricht, Roermond and Aachen, as well as a number of important monasteries: Sint-Truiden, Aldeneik, Herkenrode, Averbode, Munsterbilzen, Susteren, Sint Odiliënberg, Rolduc, Burtscheid, Kornelimünster, Stavelot, Nivelles, Aulne, Floreffe, Flône, Celles, Gembloux and Lobbes. Mosan art at its peak had a strong influence on bordering regions, notably on Rhineland art (Cologne, Bonn).

Metalworks from the Meuse Valley were also prominent in the eastern part of Central Europe, particularly in Austria as shown by the Klosterneuburg Altar, in Poland as the Anastasia Evangelistary demonstrates, and even in Hungary as seen in fragments of the Reliquary of Pétermonostora.

== Highlights of Mosan art ==
Mosan Romanesque art has been described by art historians as the first golden age of Netherlandish art (before early Netherlandish painting and Dutch Golden Age painting). Usually the term Mosan art does not include Medieval literature although Heinrich von Veldeke may be considered the first poet writing in Middle Dutch (as well as Middle High German).

=== Architecture ===
Mosan architecture can be seen as a distinctive branch in Romanesque architecture, a regional style that produced imposing churches in Aachen, Liège and Maastricht, as well as monasteries in rural areas. The fully developed Mosan style of the 12th century is a comprise between the older Meuse valley traditions and foreign influences, mainly coming from the Rhineland and Italy. An outstanding factor in Mosan architecture is the closed west front (westwerk). Unfortunately, some of the largest churches, notably Liège cathedral, and the Stavelot and Sint-Truiden abbeys, were destroyed.

- Former collegiate church St Bartholomew, Liège
- Former collegiate church of St. Denis (Liège)
- Former collegiate church St John, Liège
- Former collegiate church of Our Lady, Huy
- Collegiate Church of Saint George and Saint Ode, Amay
- Former collegiate church Saint Étienne, Waha
- Collegiate Church of Saint Foillan, Fosses-la-Ville
- Former abbey church of Saint Gertrude, Nivelles
- Collegiate Church of Saint Ursmer, Lobbes
- Collegiate Church of Saint Hadelin, Celles
- Basilica of Saint Servatius, Maastricht
- Basilica of Our Lady, Maastricht
- Former abbey church, Aldeneik
- Former abbey church, Rolduc
- Former abbey church, Susteren
- Former abbey church, Sint Odiliënberg
- Munsterkerk, Roermond
- Aachen Cathedral (westwork)
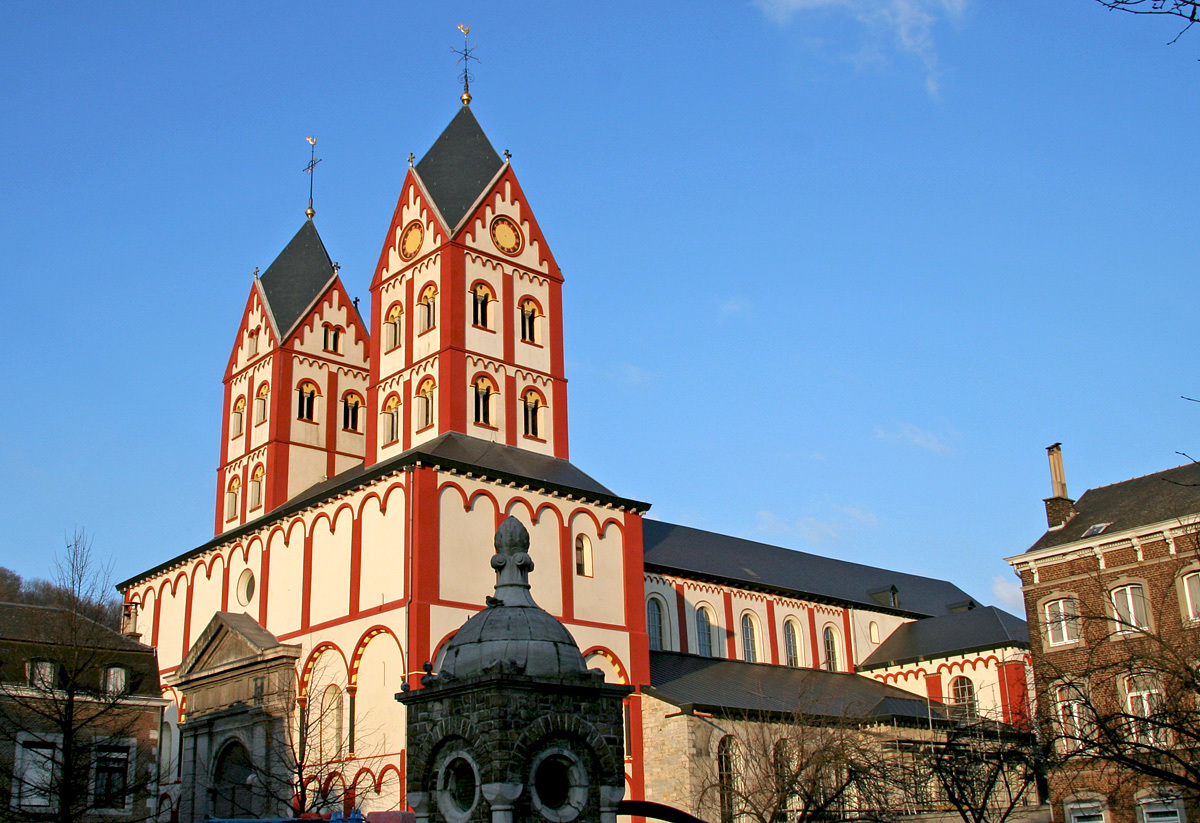
Liège, St Bartholomew's

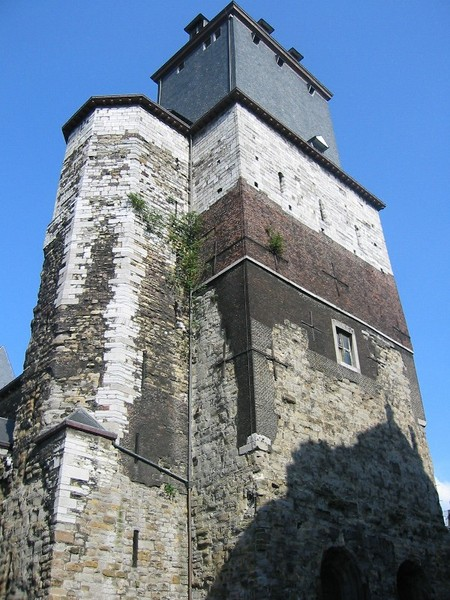
Liège, St Denis, westwork

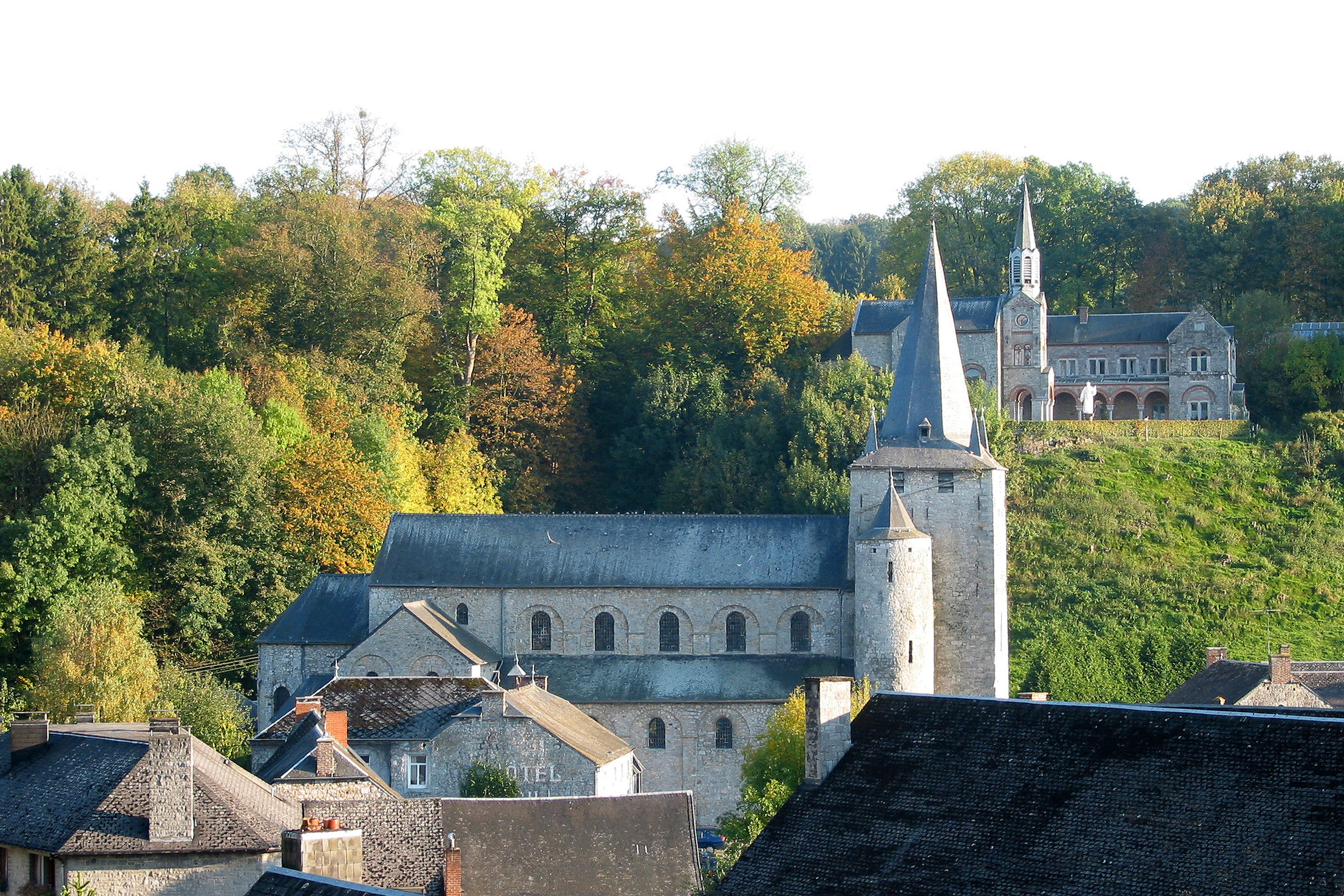
Celles, Saint Hadelin's

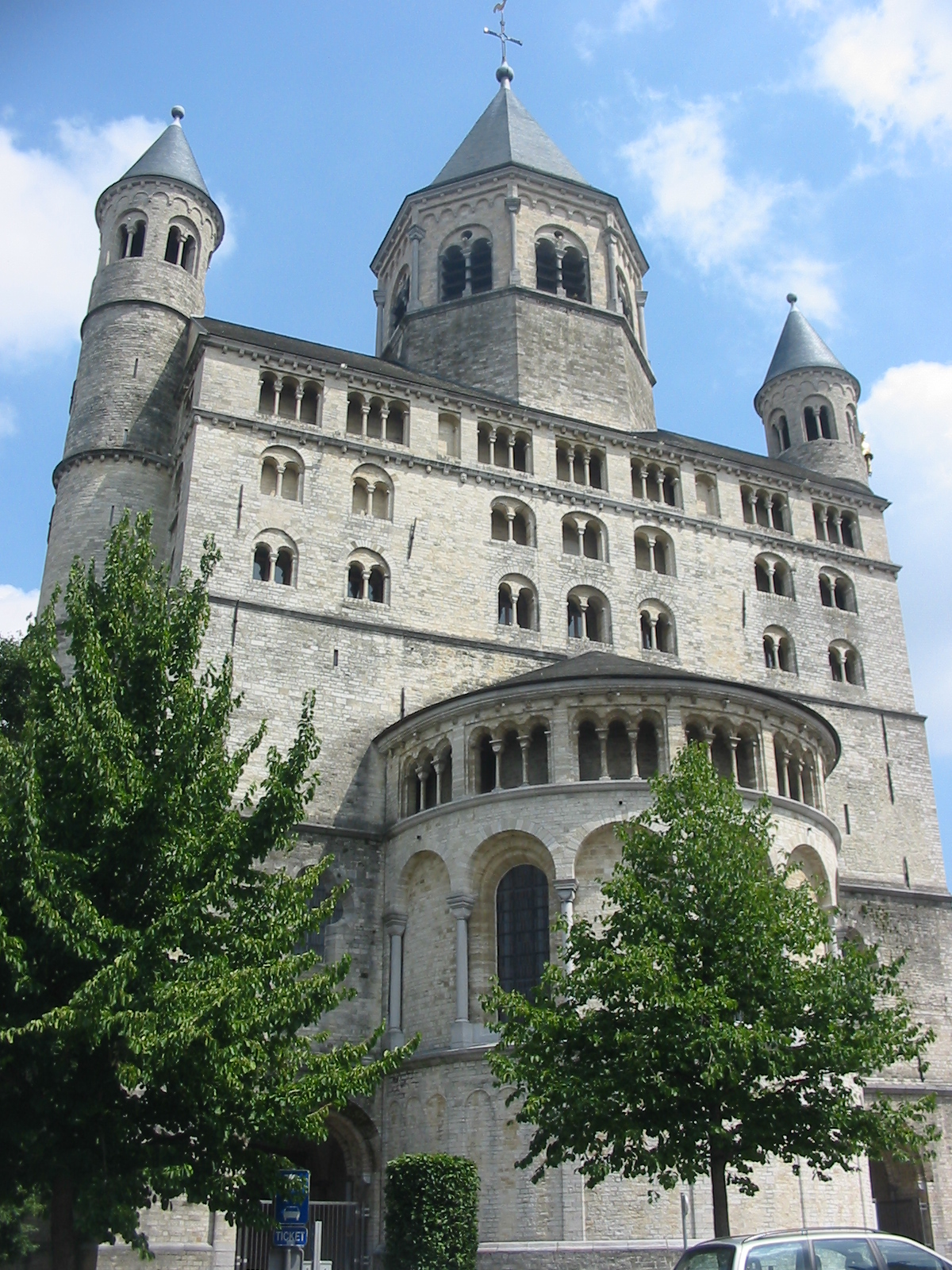
Nivelles. Westwork abbey church

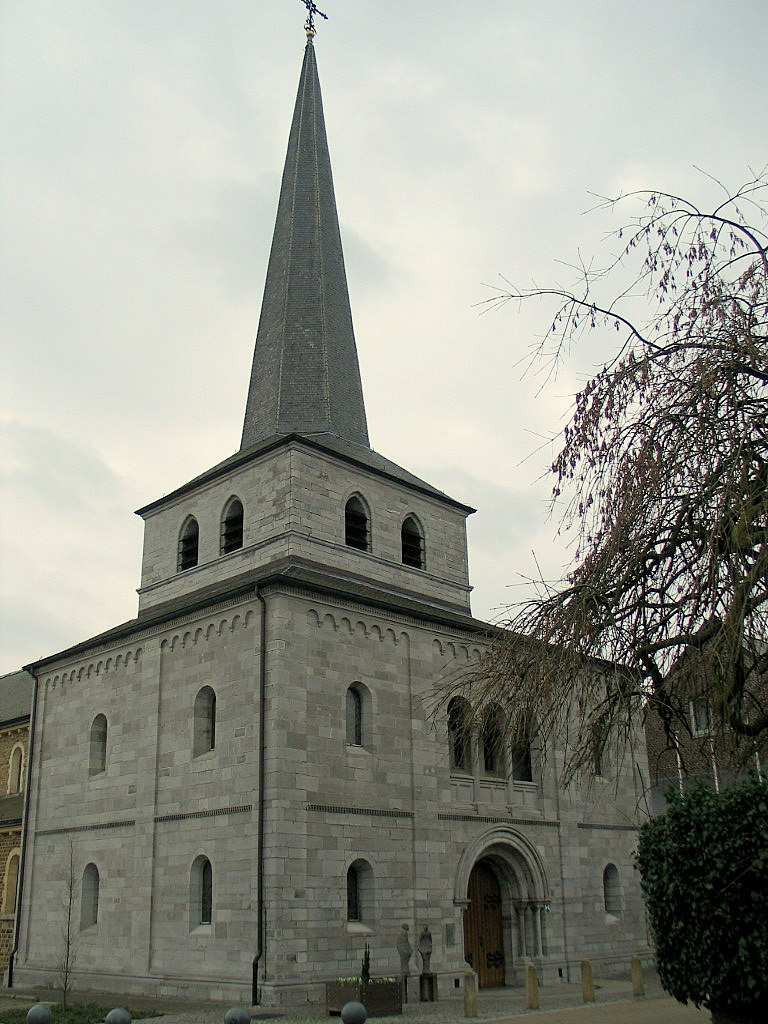
Aldeneik, Westwork

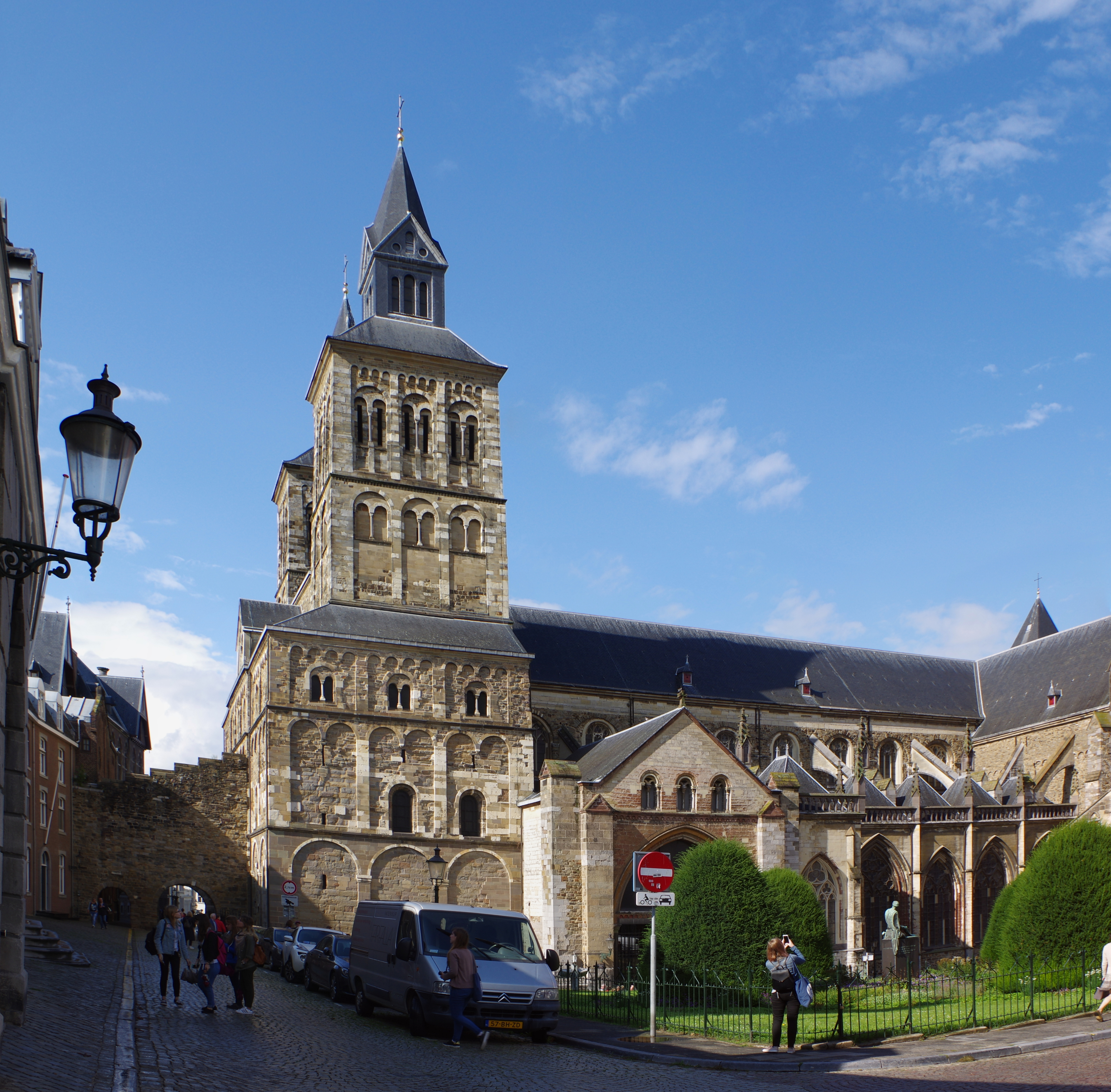
Maastricht, St Servatius, westwork

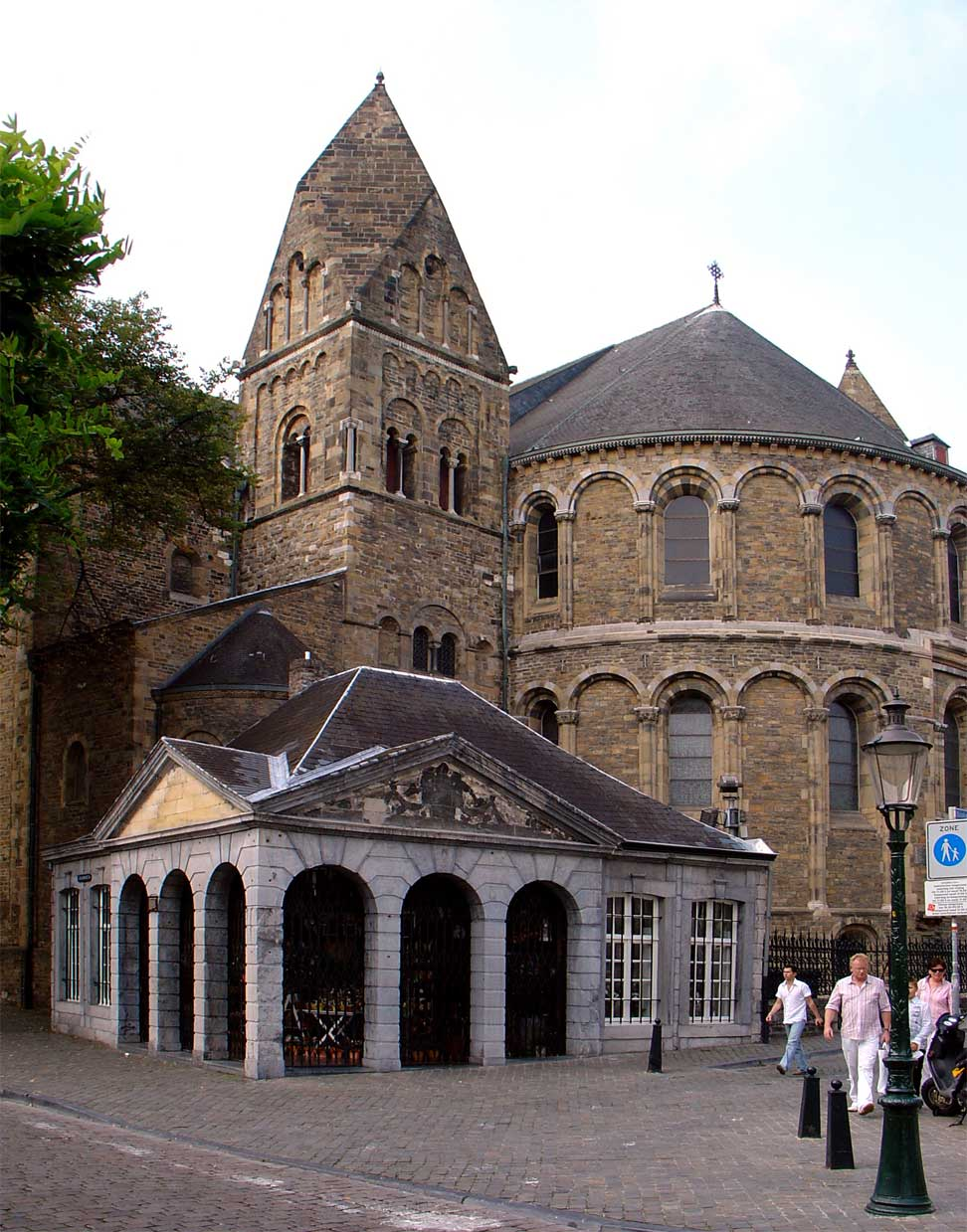
Maastricht, Our Lady's, east front

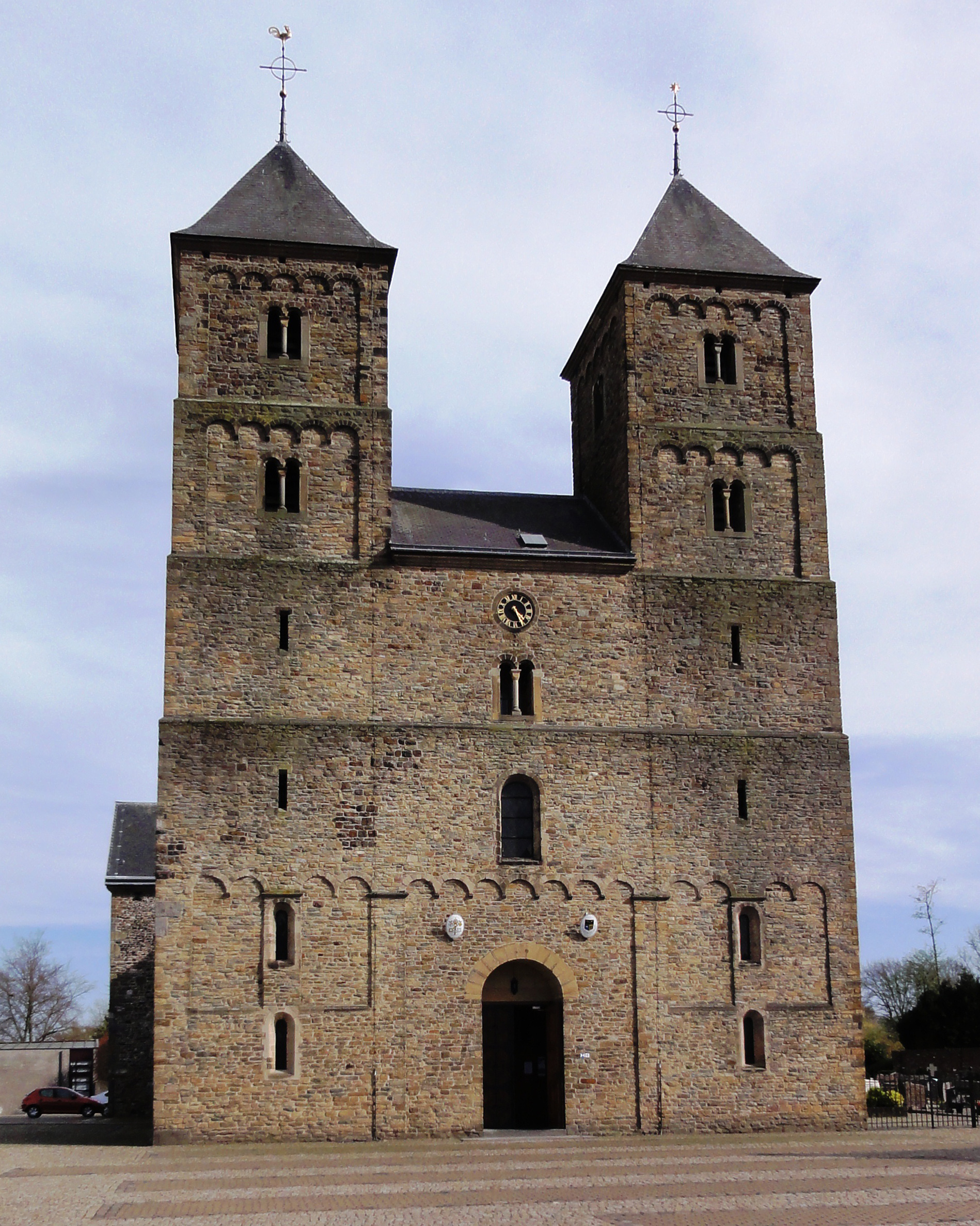
Susteren, Westwork

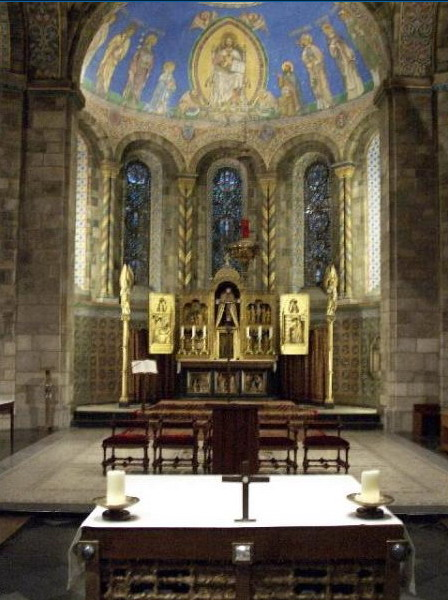
Rolduc, Interior

=== Stone carving ===
Mosan stone carving reached a peak in the 12th century in Maastricht, Liège and Nivelles. Maastricht 'metsen' (stone carvers) worked on capitals and reliefs as far afield as Utrecht, Bonn and Eisenach.

- Carved capitals in western galleries of Basilica of Saint Servatius, Maastricht (12th century)
- Carved capitals in East choir of Basilica of Our Lady, Maastricht (12th century)
- Carved capitals in crypt of abbey church of Rolduc (12th century)
- Vierge de Dom Rupert (12th century), Curtius Museum, Liège
- Pierre Boudon relief (12th century), Curtius Museum, Liège
- Samson Portal, Collegiate Church of Saint Gertrude, Nivelles
- Baptismal font, Furnaux (Namur)
- Oath on the Relics relief (12th century), Basilica of Our Lady, Maastricht
- Majestas Domini tympanum (12th century), Basilica of Saint Servatius, Maastricht
- Double relief choir screen (12th century), Basilica of Saint Servatius, Maastricht
- Four-part relief in Saint Peter's Church, Utrecht
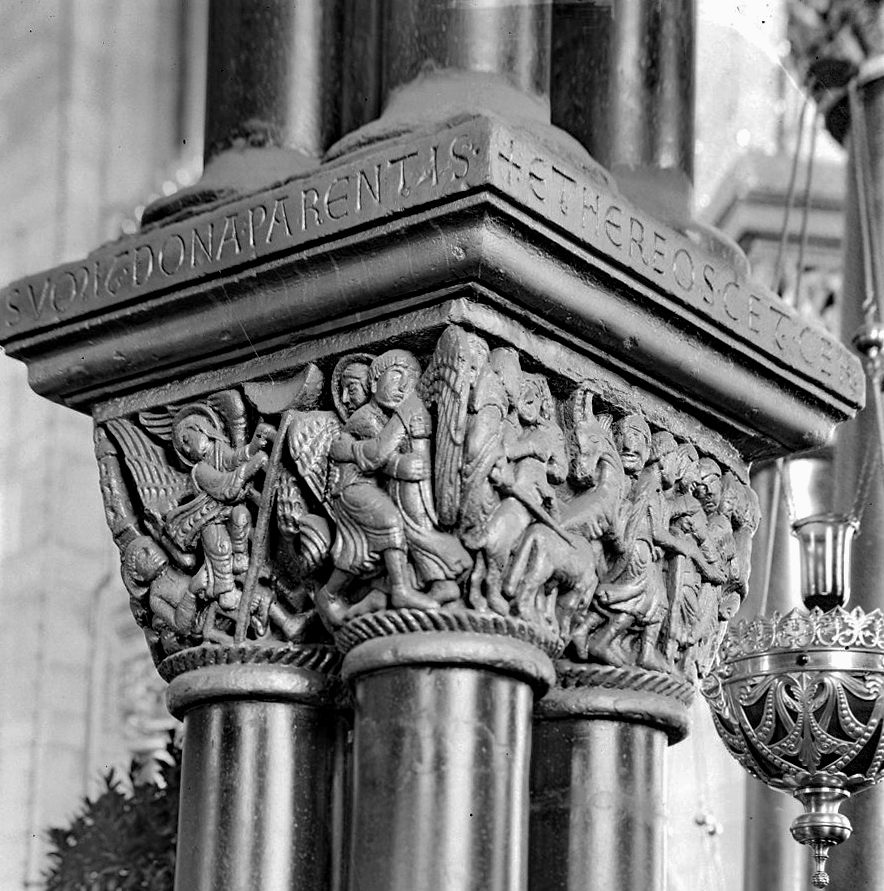
Maastricht, Basilica of Our Lady. Carved 4-fold capital

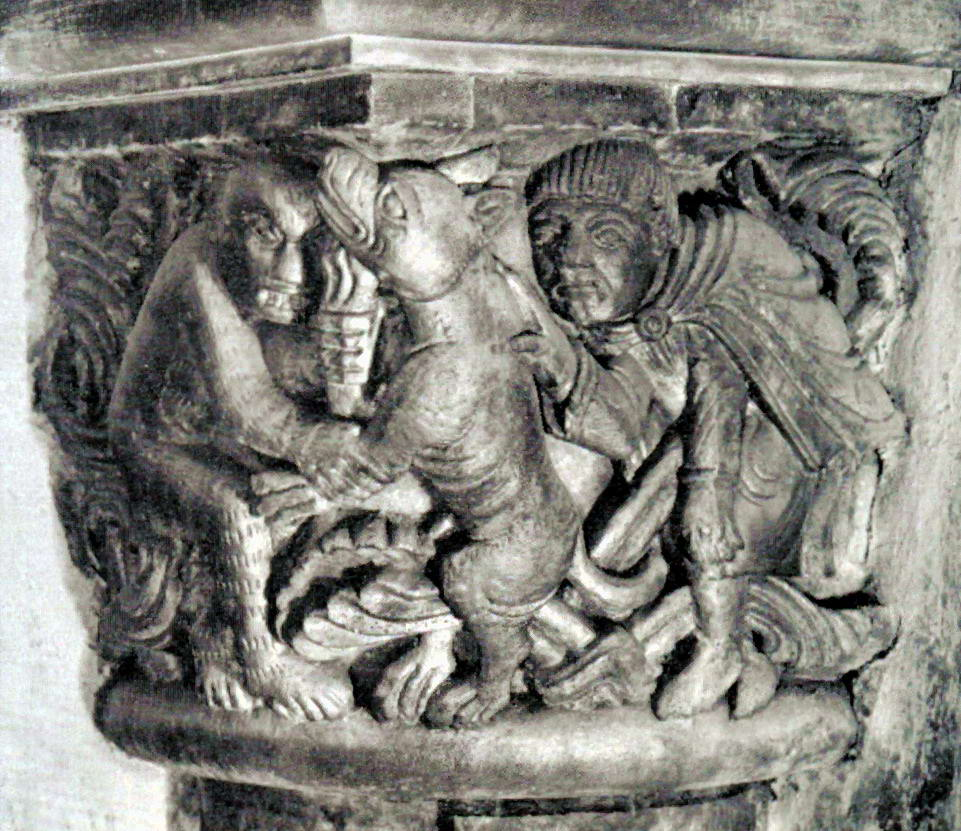
Maastricht, St Servatius. Carved capital in westwork

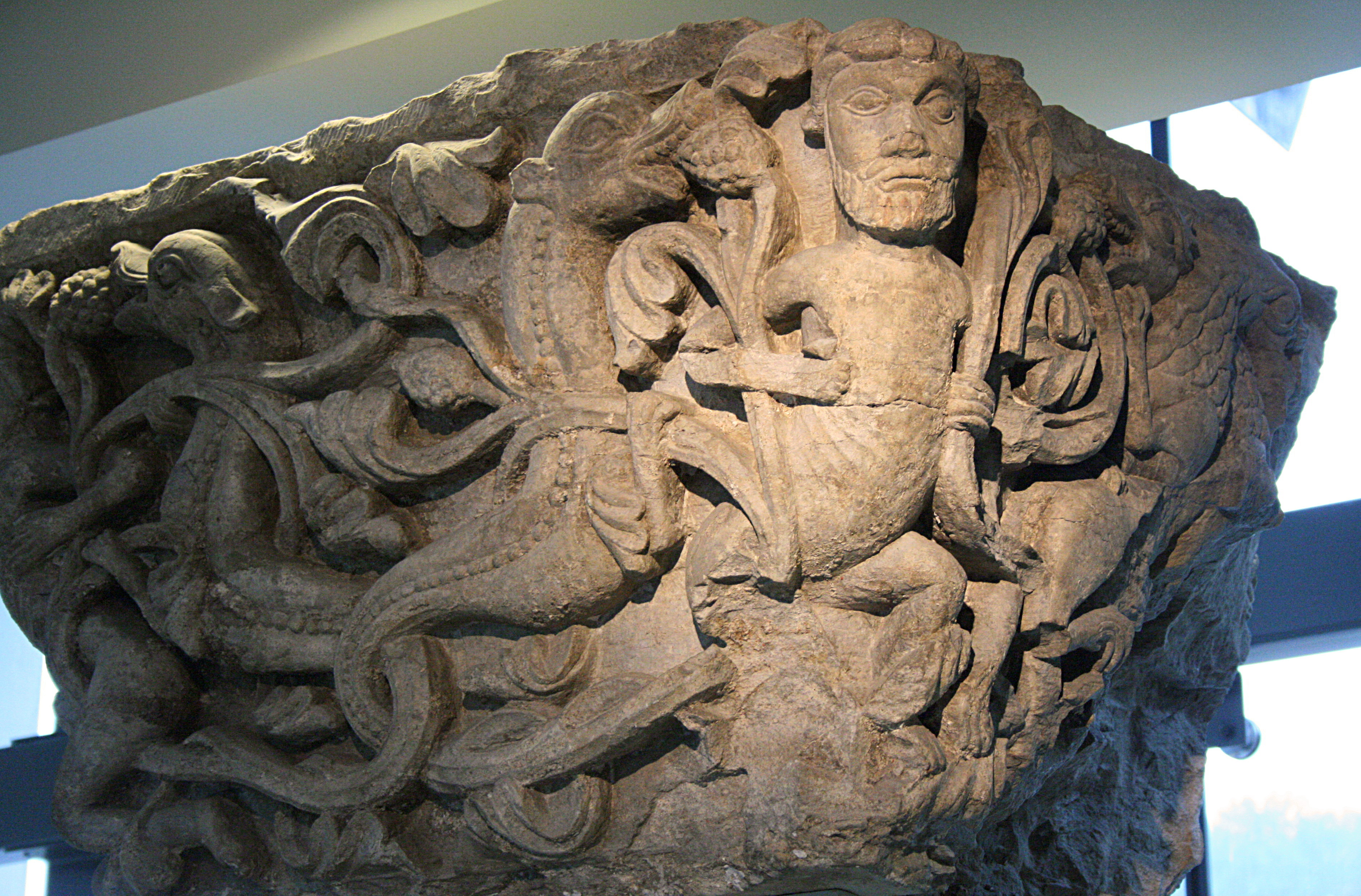
Liège, Curtius Museum. Carved capital from St Lambert's Cathedral

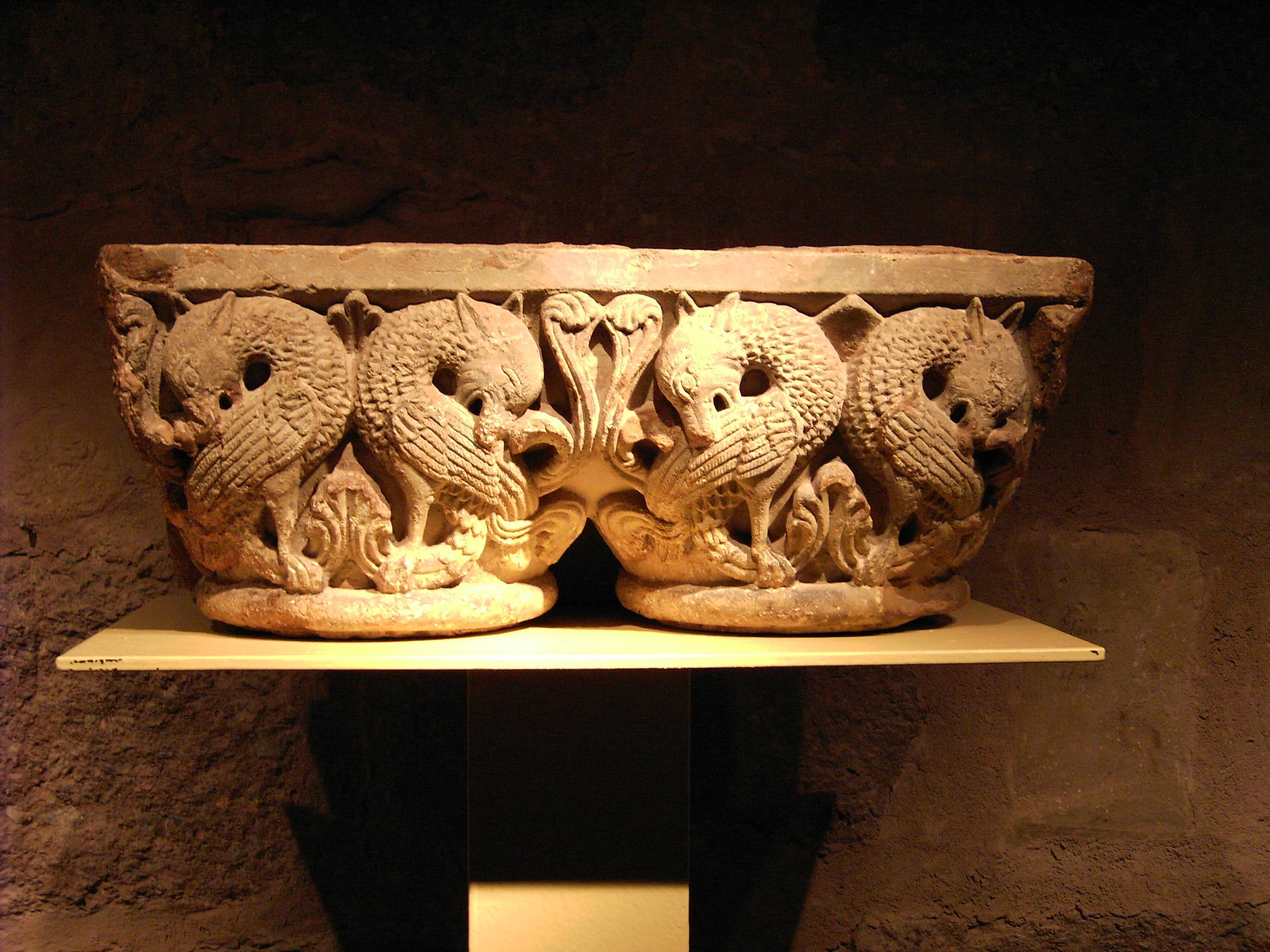
Eisenach. Dragon capital in the Wartburg

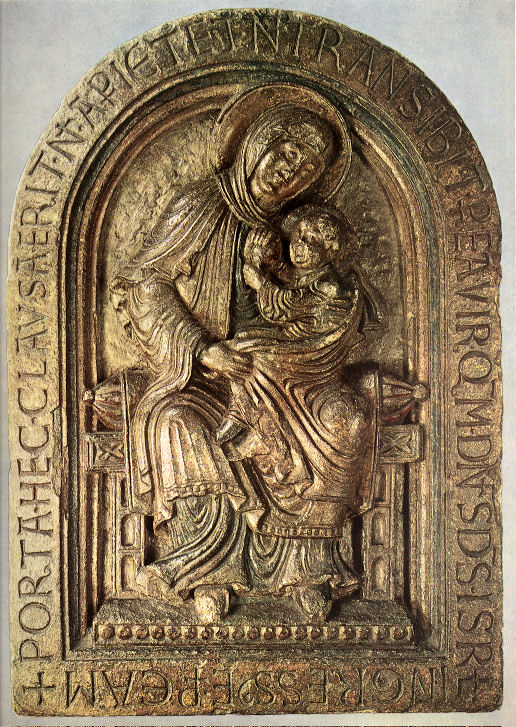
Liège, Curtius Museum. 'Vierge de Dom Rupert'

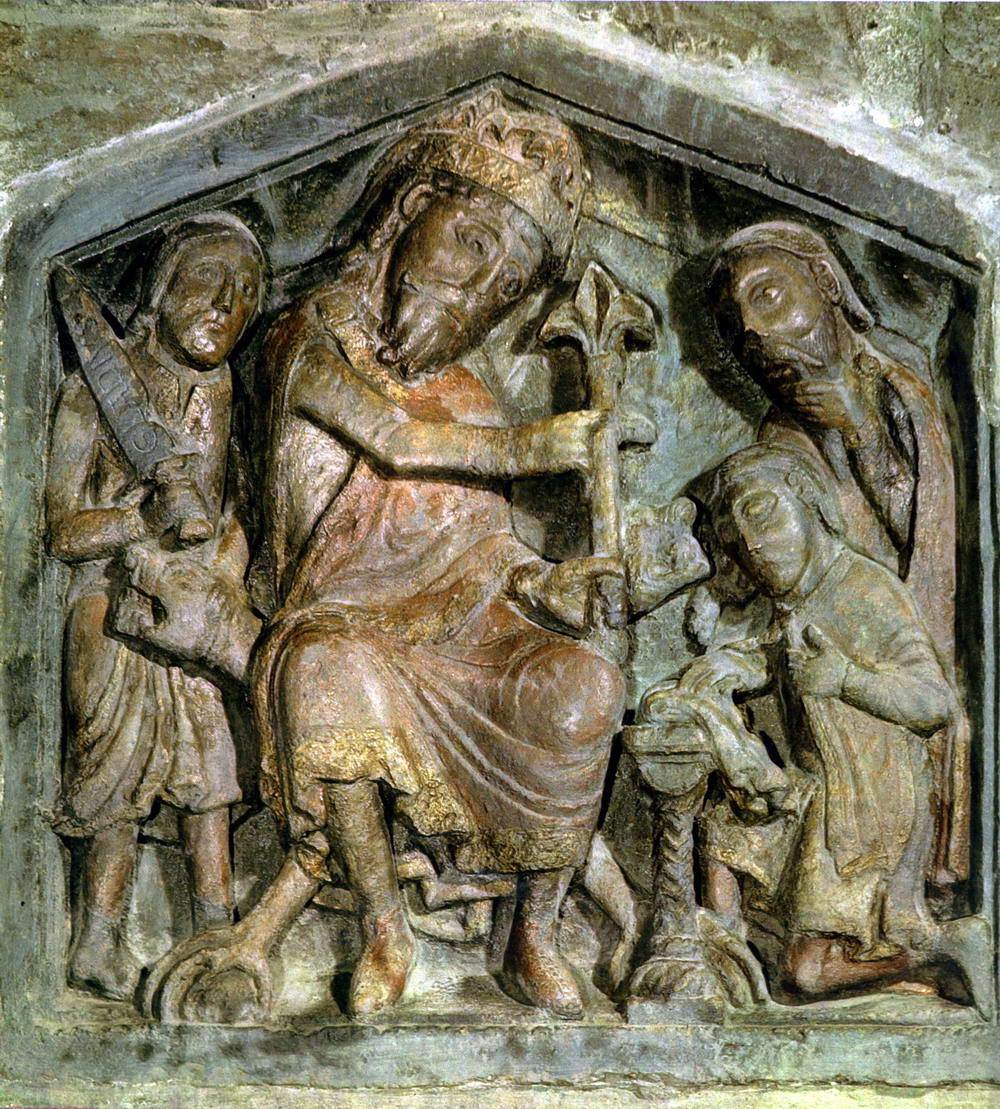
Maastricht, Church of Our Lady. 'Oath on the Relics'

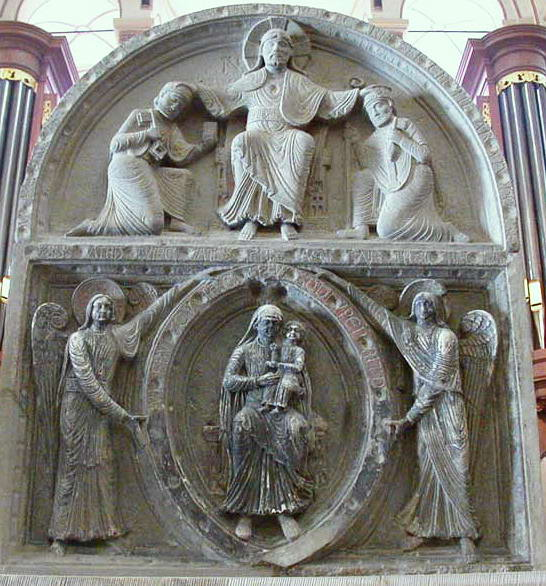
Maastricht, St Servatius. 2-part relief

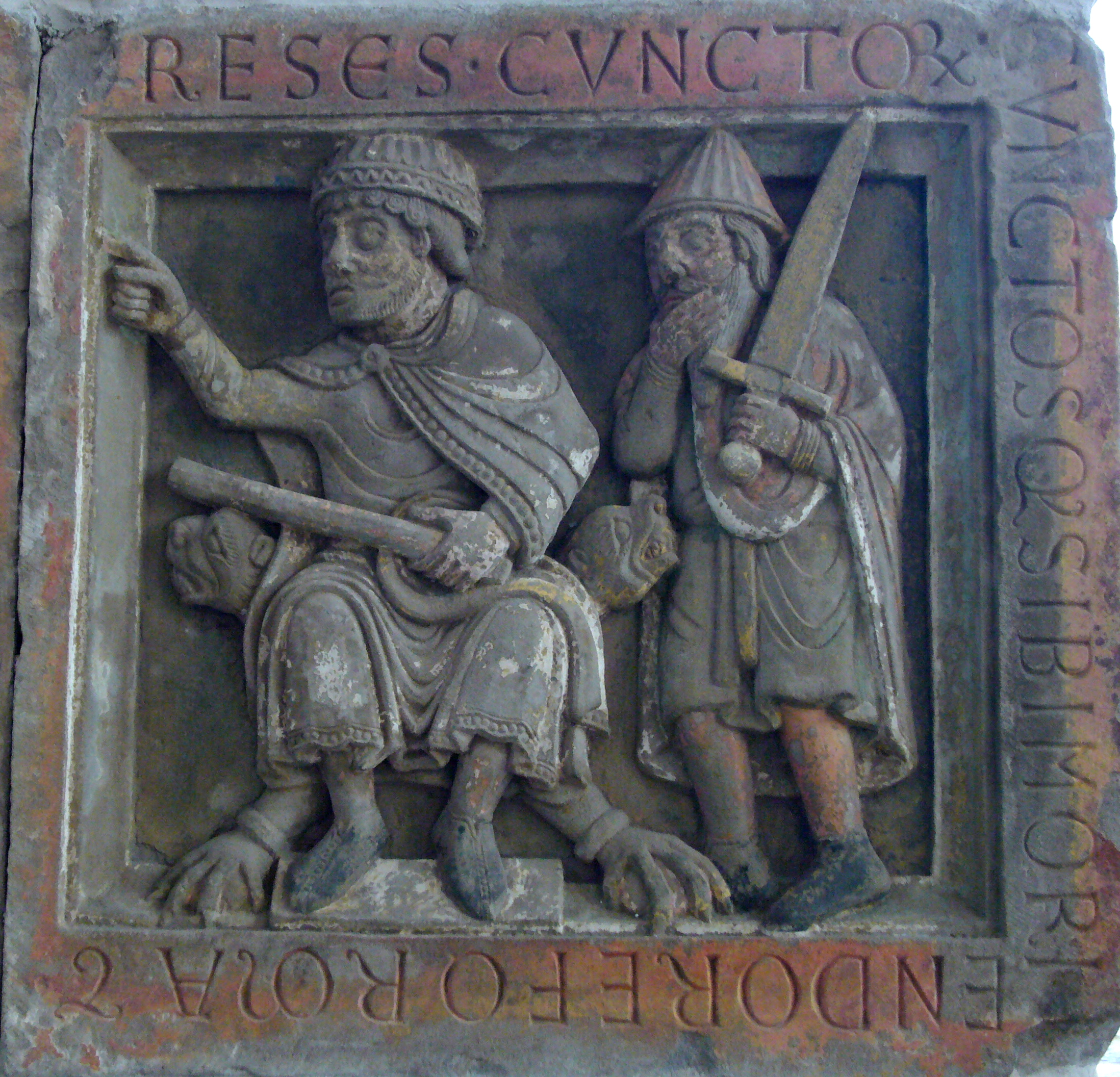
Utrecht, St Peter's. 4-part relief. Pontius Pilate pointing at Christ

=== Metalwork ===
Metalwork has been considered the high art of the 12th and early 13th-century Meuse region, culminating in the work of Nicholas of Verdun, which is of exceptionally high quality. The Shrine of the Three Kings at Cologne Cathedral, the Anno Shrine in Siegburg and the Shrine of Our Lady in Tournai are among his best work. Other important metalworkers were Renier de Huy and Hugo d'Oignies.

- Baptismal font at St Bartholomew's Church, Liège (early 12th century) by Renier de Huy
- Shrine of Saint Servatius (±1165) in Maastricht
- Shrine of Saint Hadelin (1170, partly 11th century) in Visé
- Shrine of Saint Remacle in Stavelot
- Shrines of Saint Domitian and Saint Mangold (by Godefroid de Huy, ±1172-1189) in Huy
- Shrine of Our Lady (1205) at Tournai Cathedral by Nicholas of Verdun
- Shrine of the Three Kings at Cologne Cathedral (1180) by Nicholas of Verdun
- Shrine of Charlemagne (Karlsschrein, 1215) and Shrine of Mary (Marienschrein, 1238), Aachen Cathedral
- Barbarossa Chandelier (1170), Aachen Cathedral
- Retable of the Pentecost (1160–1170, Cluny Museum, Paris – )
- Stavelot Triptych. Morgan Library, New York City
- Reliquary of St. Maurus, now in Bečov nad Teplou
- Stavelot altar base. Royal Museums of Art and History, Brussels
- Reliquary with head of Pope Alexander I, Royal Museums of Art and History, Brussels
- The foot of the so-called Cross of Saint Bertin. Museum of Saint-Omer
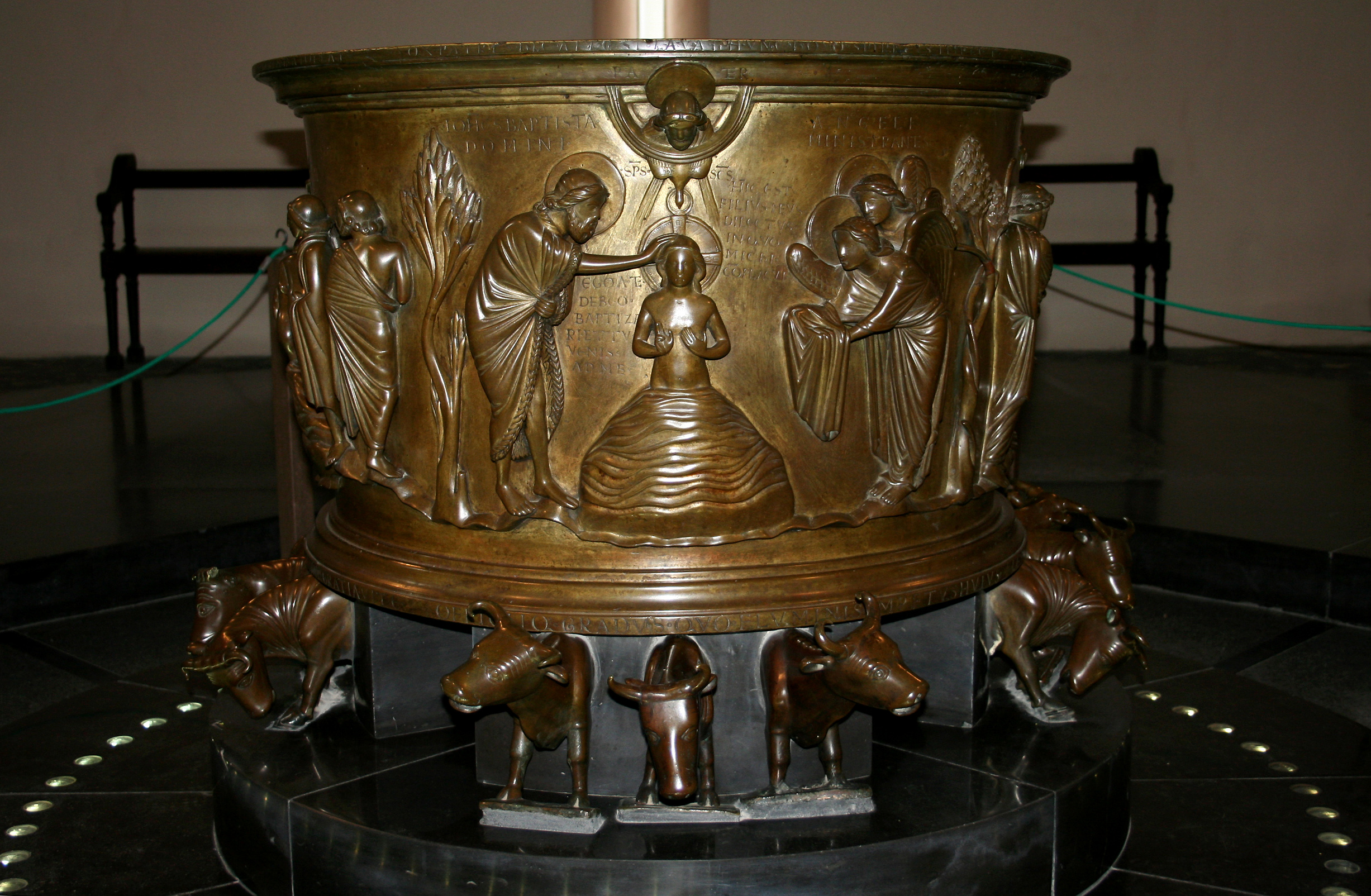
Baptismal font. St Bartholomew's, Liège

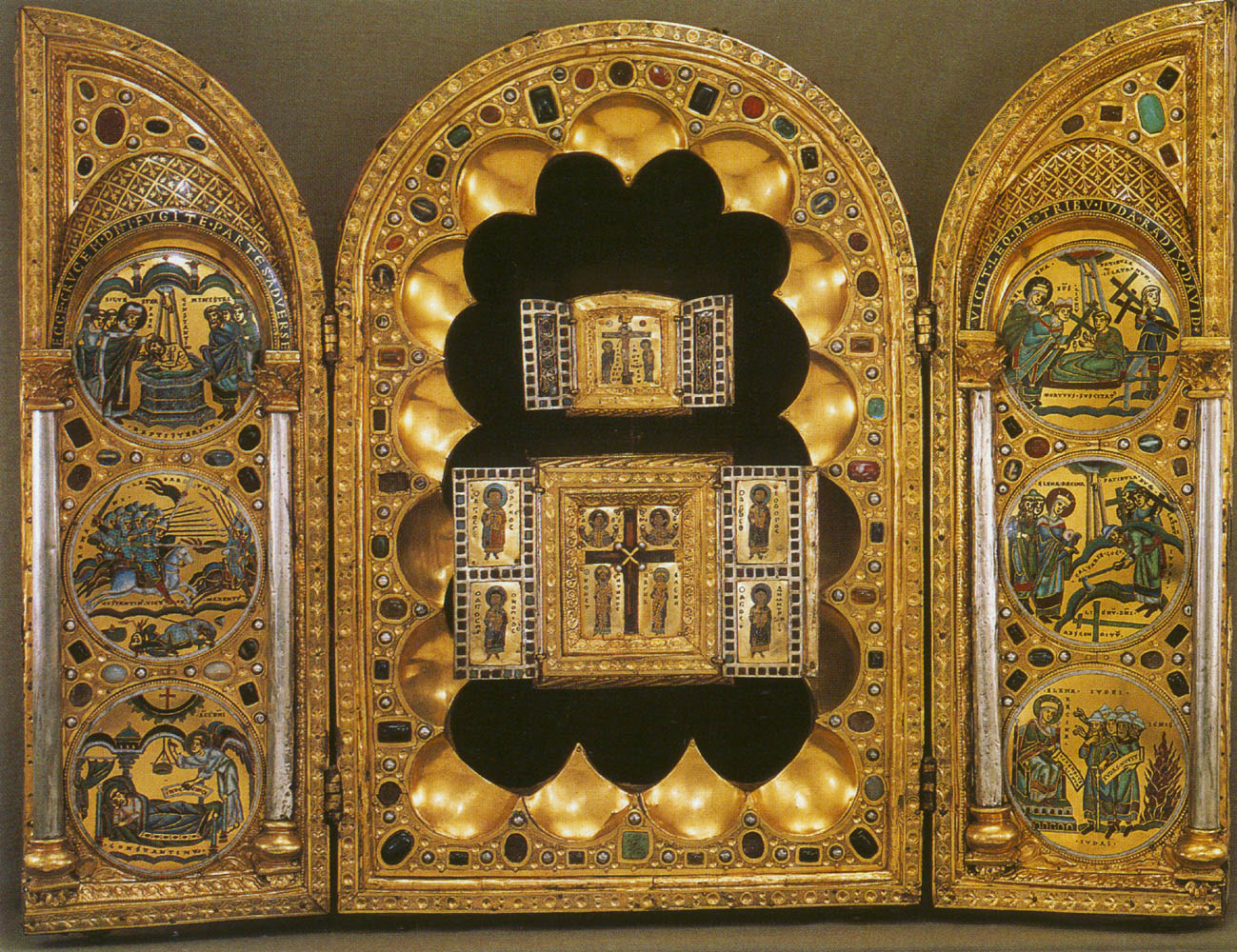
Stavelot Triptych, Morgan Library, New York

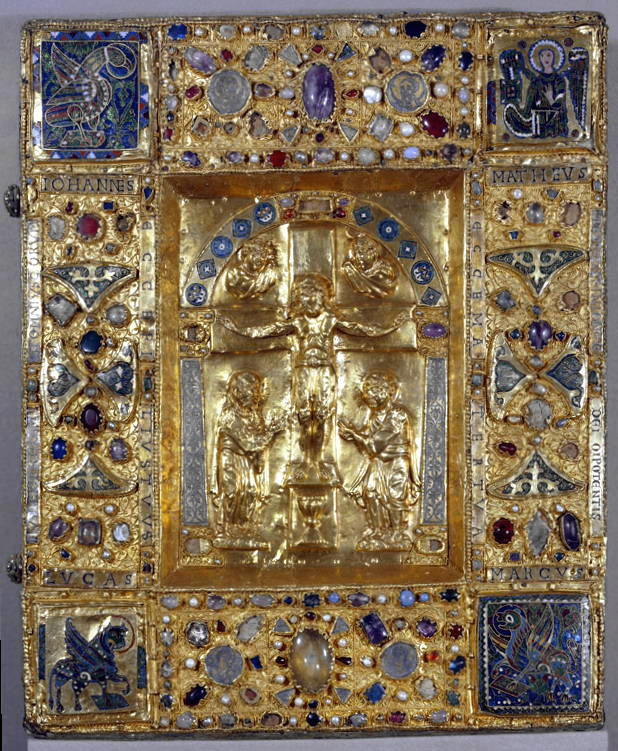
Mosan reliquary in the Louvre, Paris

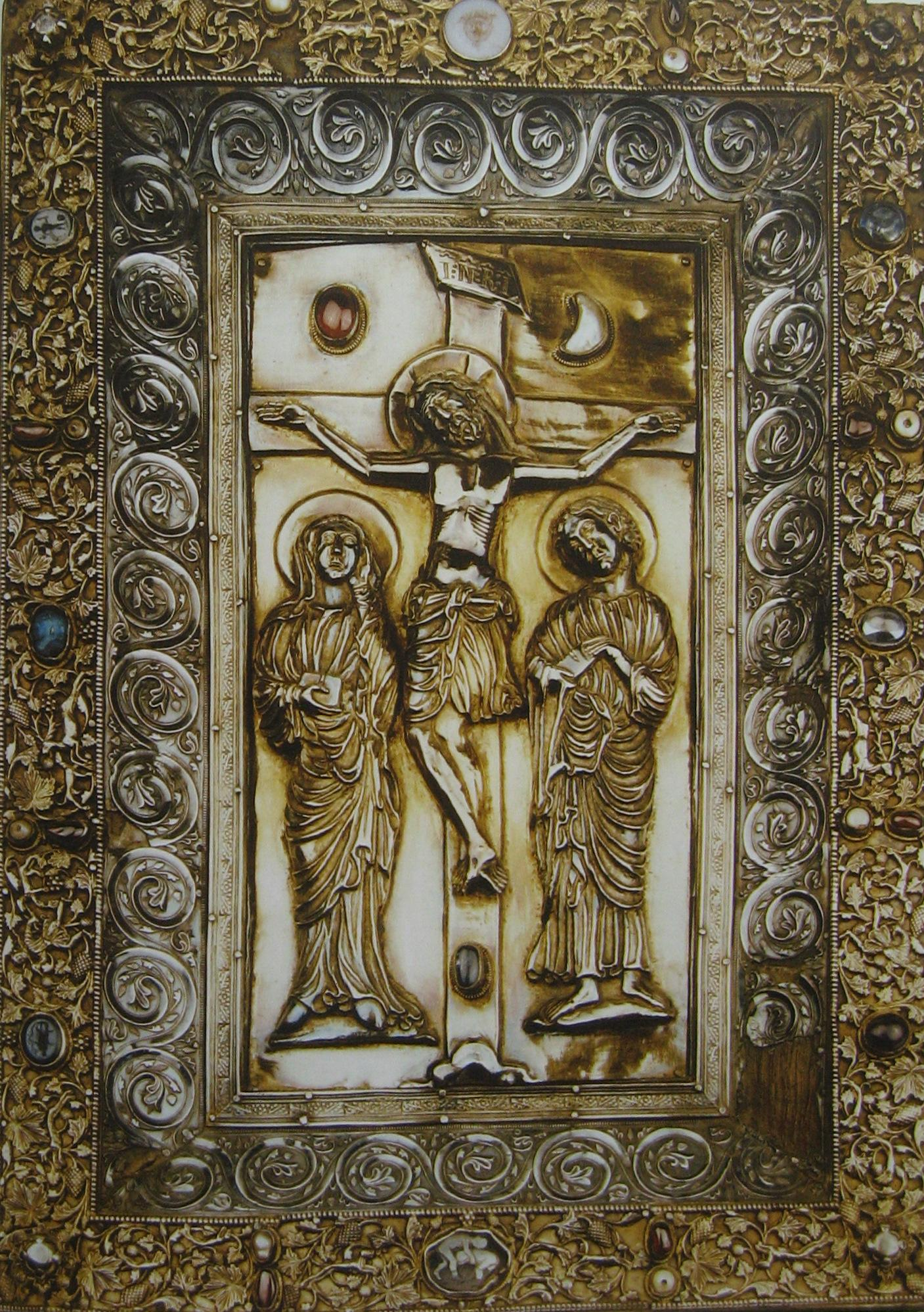
Book-cover by Hugo d'Oignies

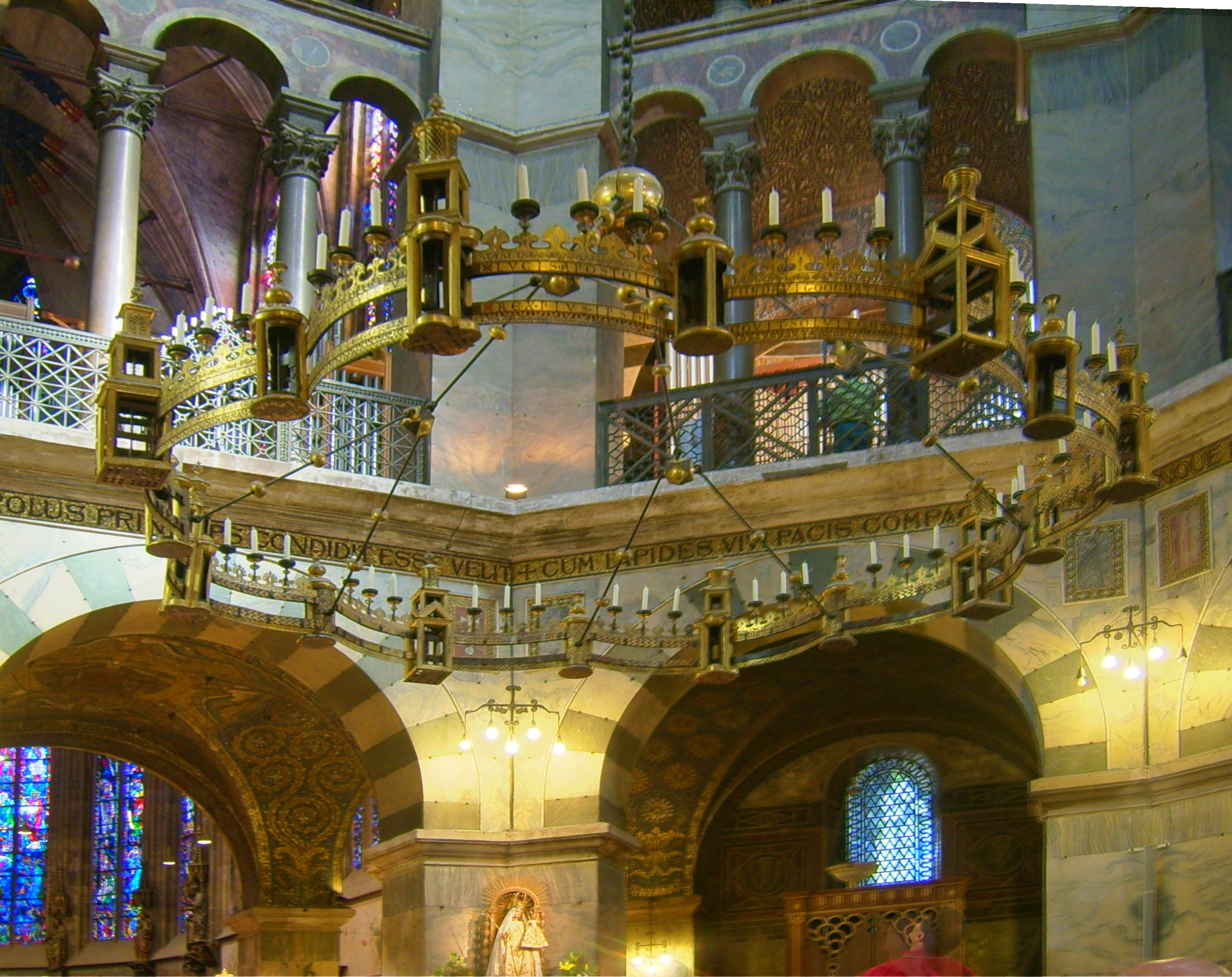
Barbarossa Chandelier, Aachen Cathedral

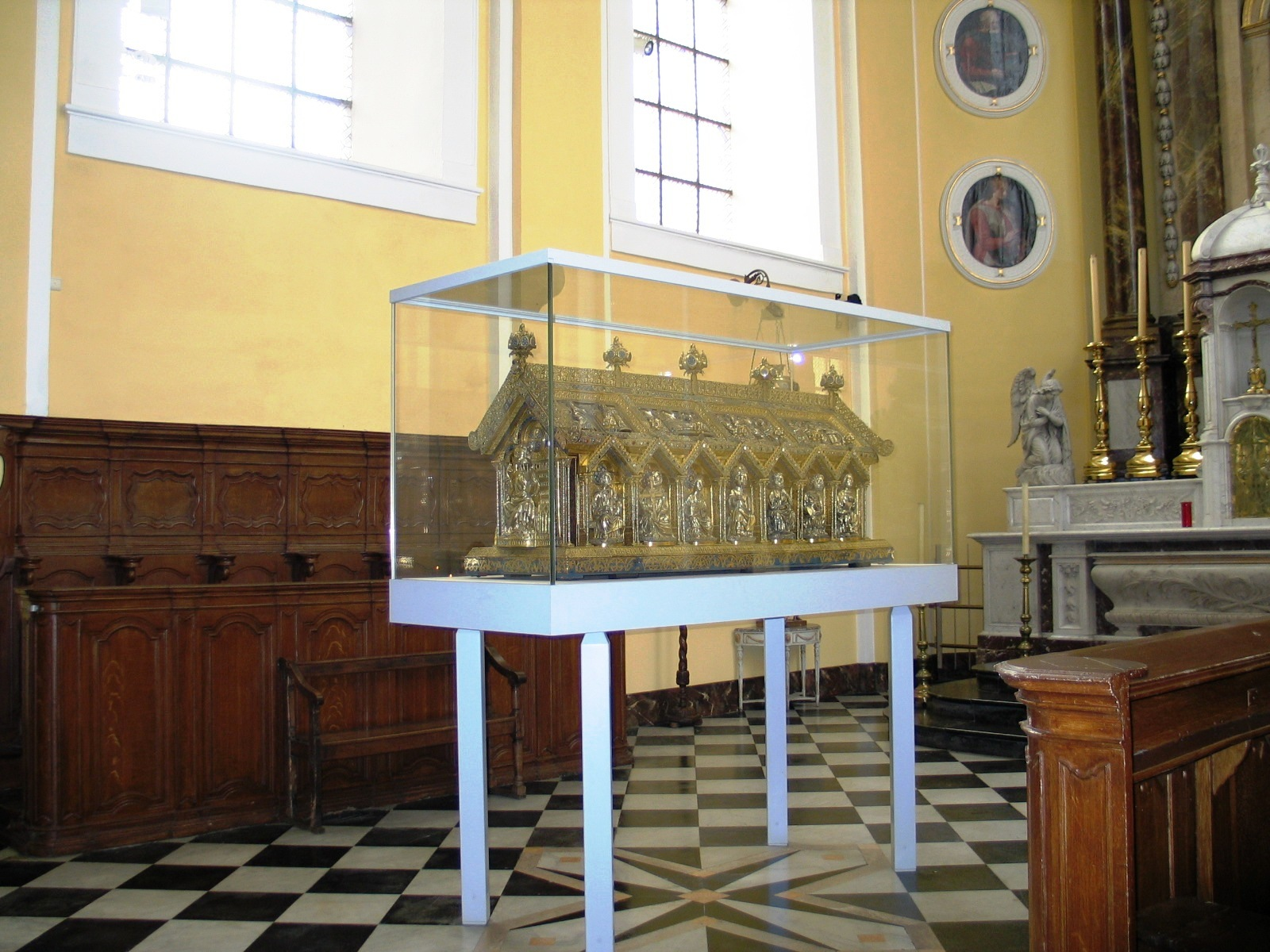
Shrine of Saint Remacle, Stavelot

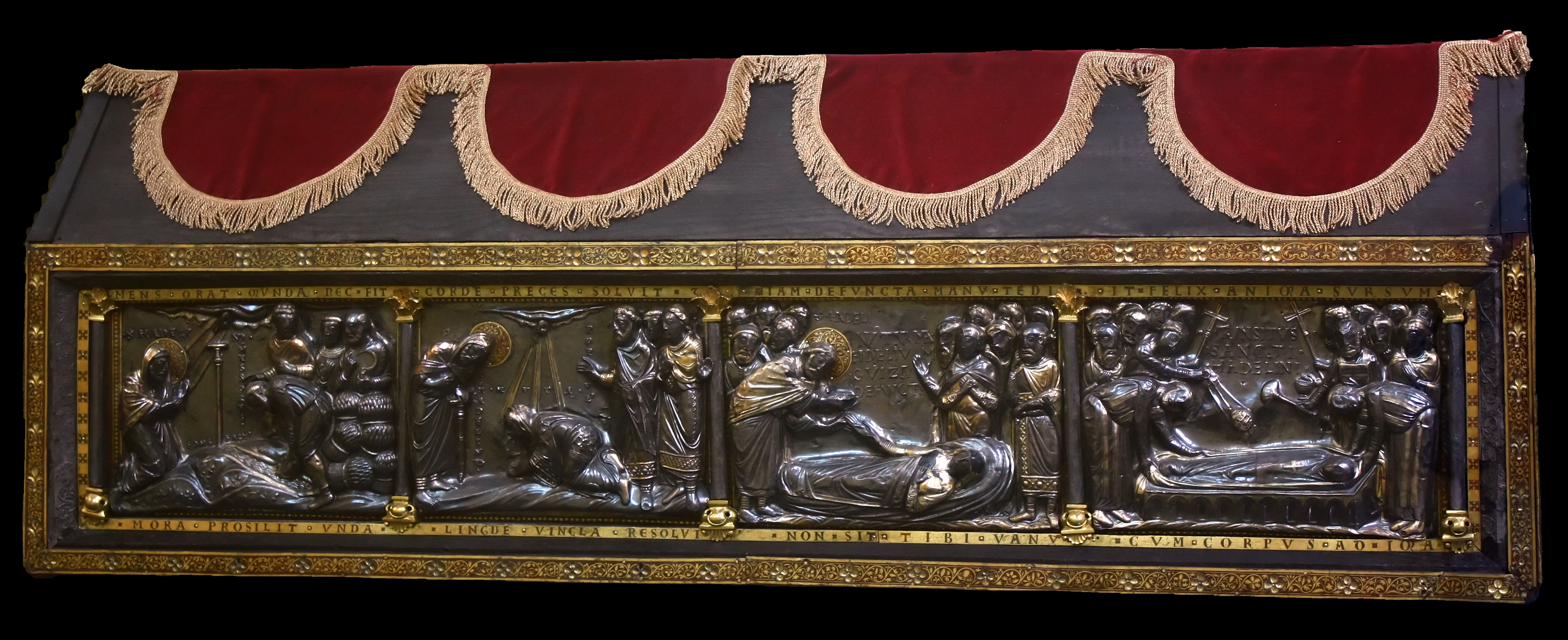
Shrine of Saint Hadelin, Visé

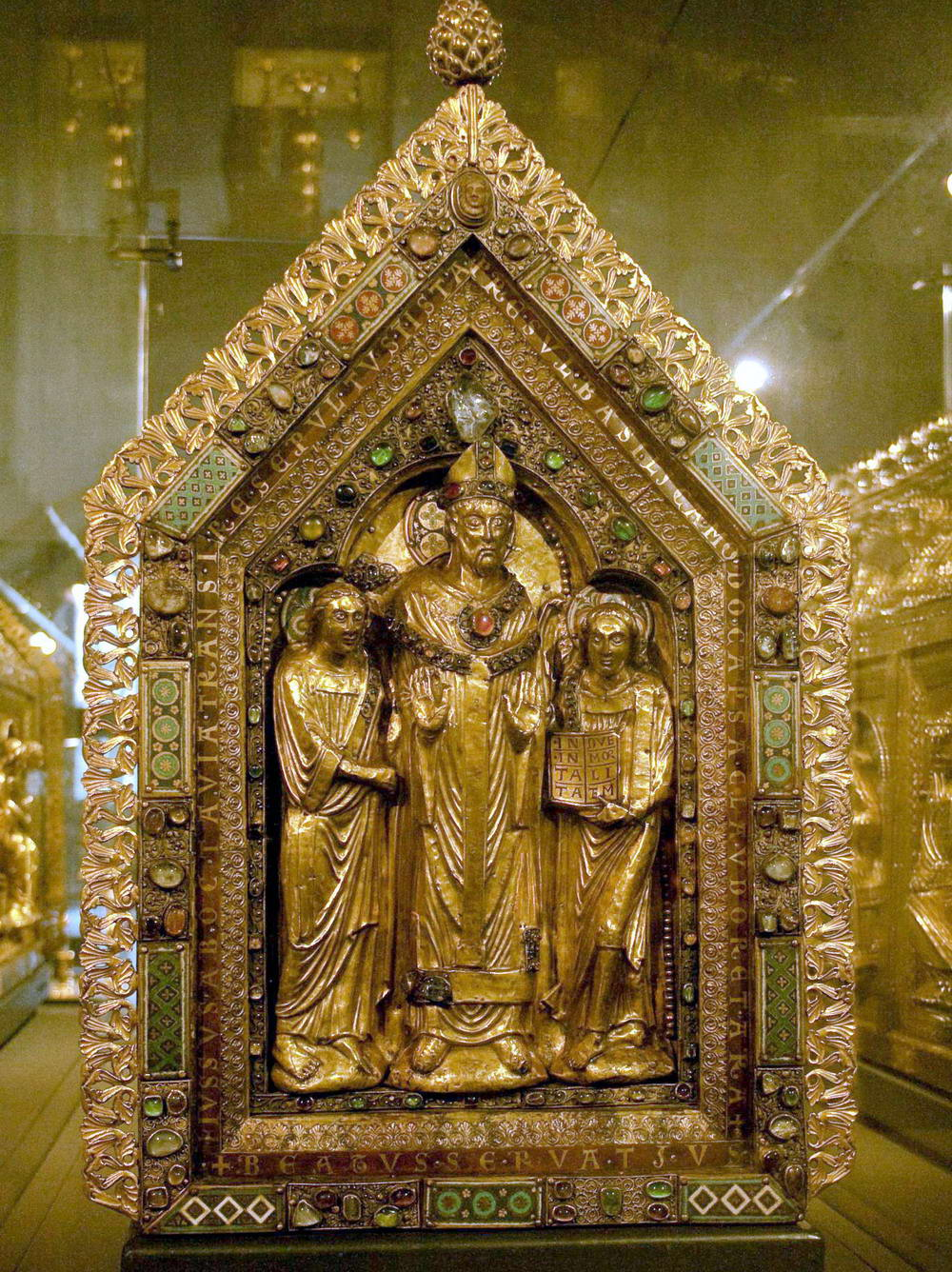
Maastricht. Shrine of Saint Servatius

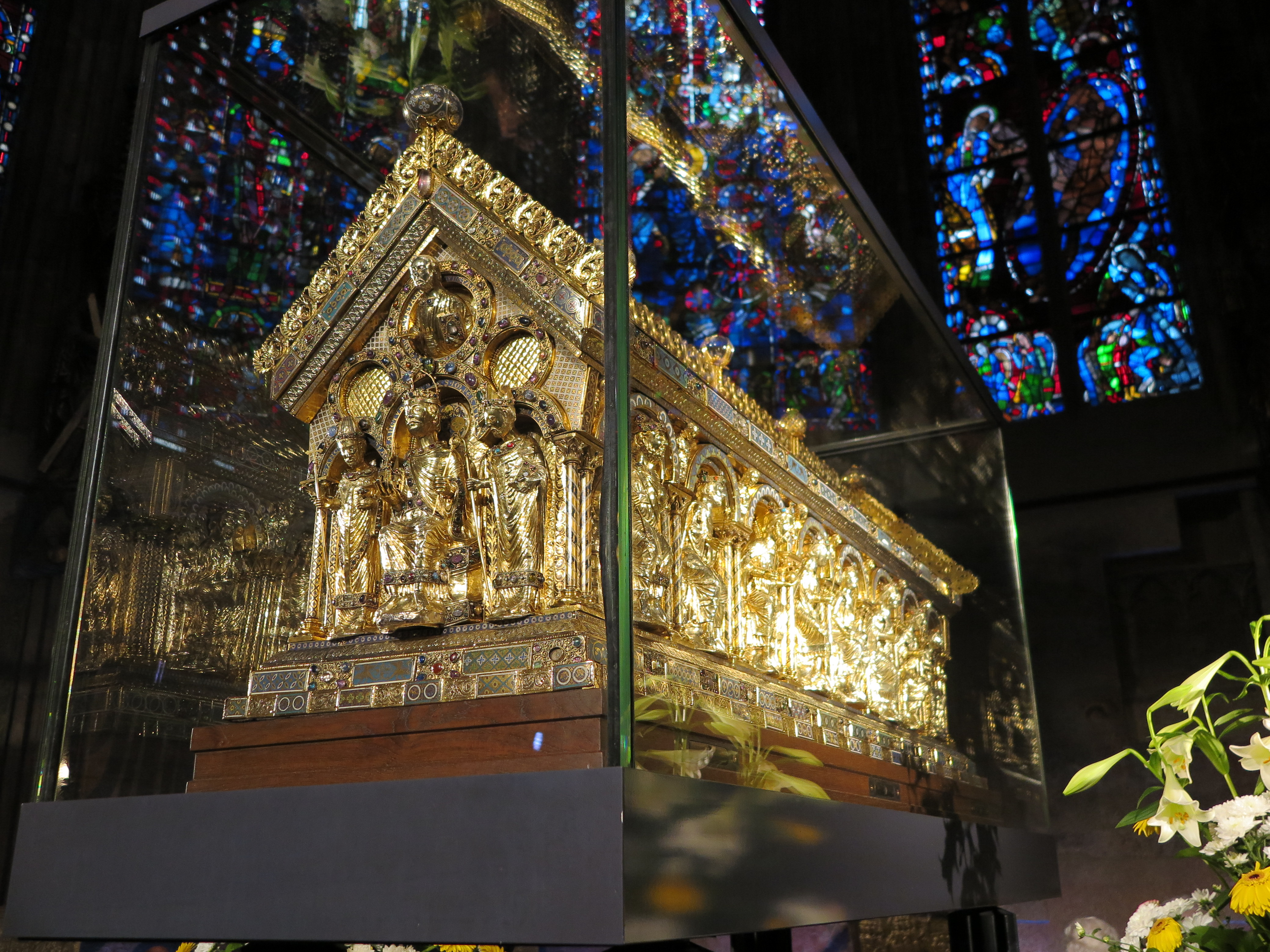
Shrine of Charlemagne, Aachen Cathedral

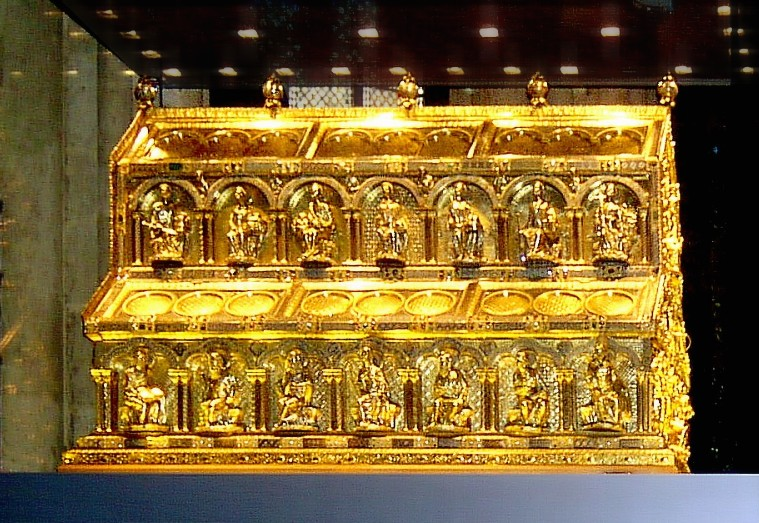
Shrine of the Three Kings, Cologne Cathedral

=== Painting, illumination and other works of art ===
Very little has come to us from what must have been an impressive body of Mosan murals. Wolfram von Eschenbach, in his Parzival expressed his high regard for Maastricht (and Cologne) painters (Parzival, 158, 13-16). Book illumination, like the rest of the arts, was at its zenith in the second half of the 12th century. The principal centres were the abbey of Saint Laurent in Liège and the abbeys of Stavelot and Lobbes. Another highly developed art was vitreous enameling, especially in the champlevé technique.

- Mural of the choir vault (heavily restored). Basilica of Saint Servatius, Maastricht
- Stavelot Bible (11th century). British Library
- Floreffe Bible (12th century). British Library, London
- Evangeliary of Averbode (12th century). University Library, Liège
- Manuscripts from the abbey of Sint-Truiden
- Evangeliary of Notger (10th-12th century)
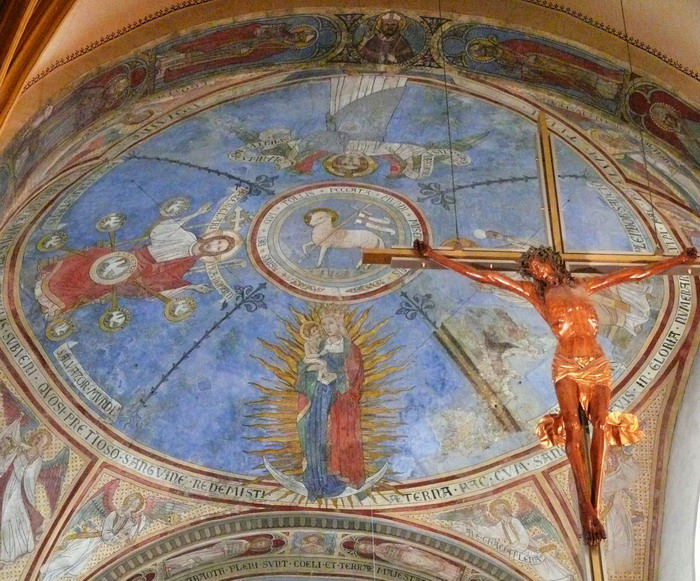
Ceiling painting Basilica of Saint Servatius, Maastricht

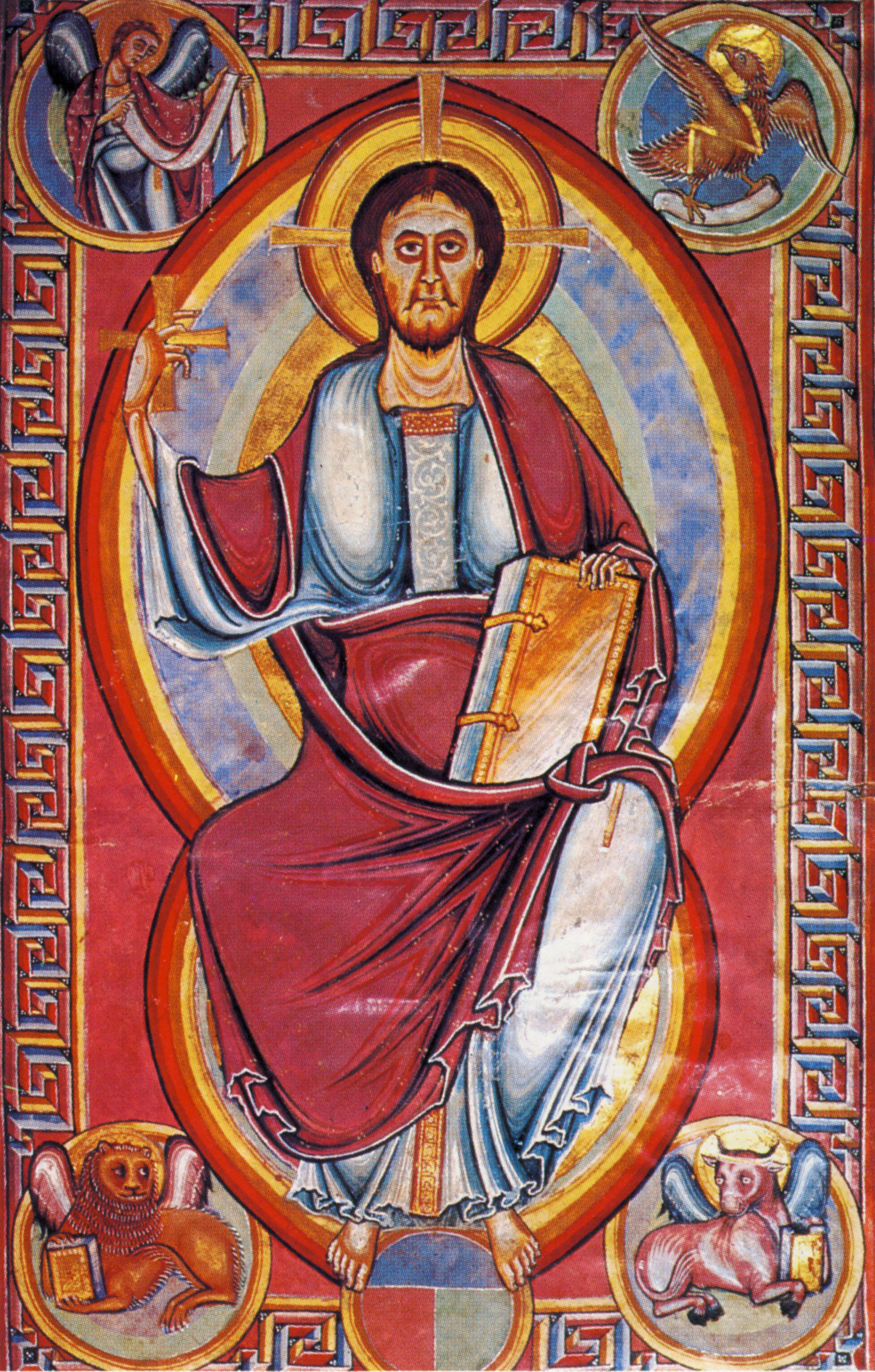
Page from Stavelot Bible, British Library

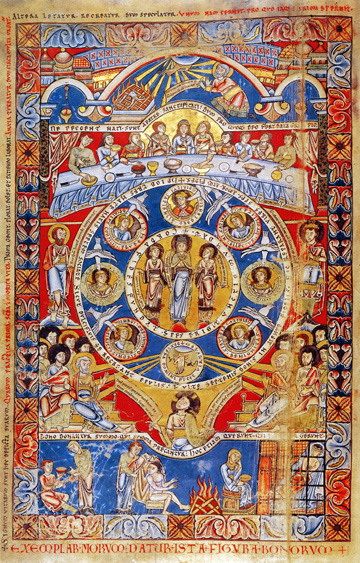
Page from Floreffe Bible, British Library

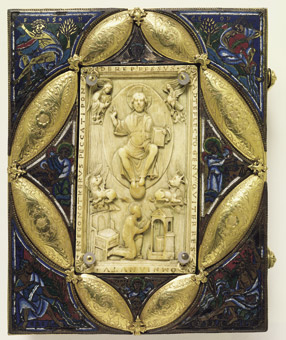
Evangeliary of Notger. Ivory and enamel

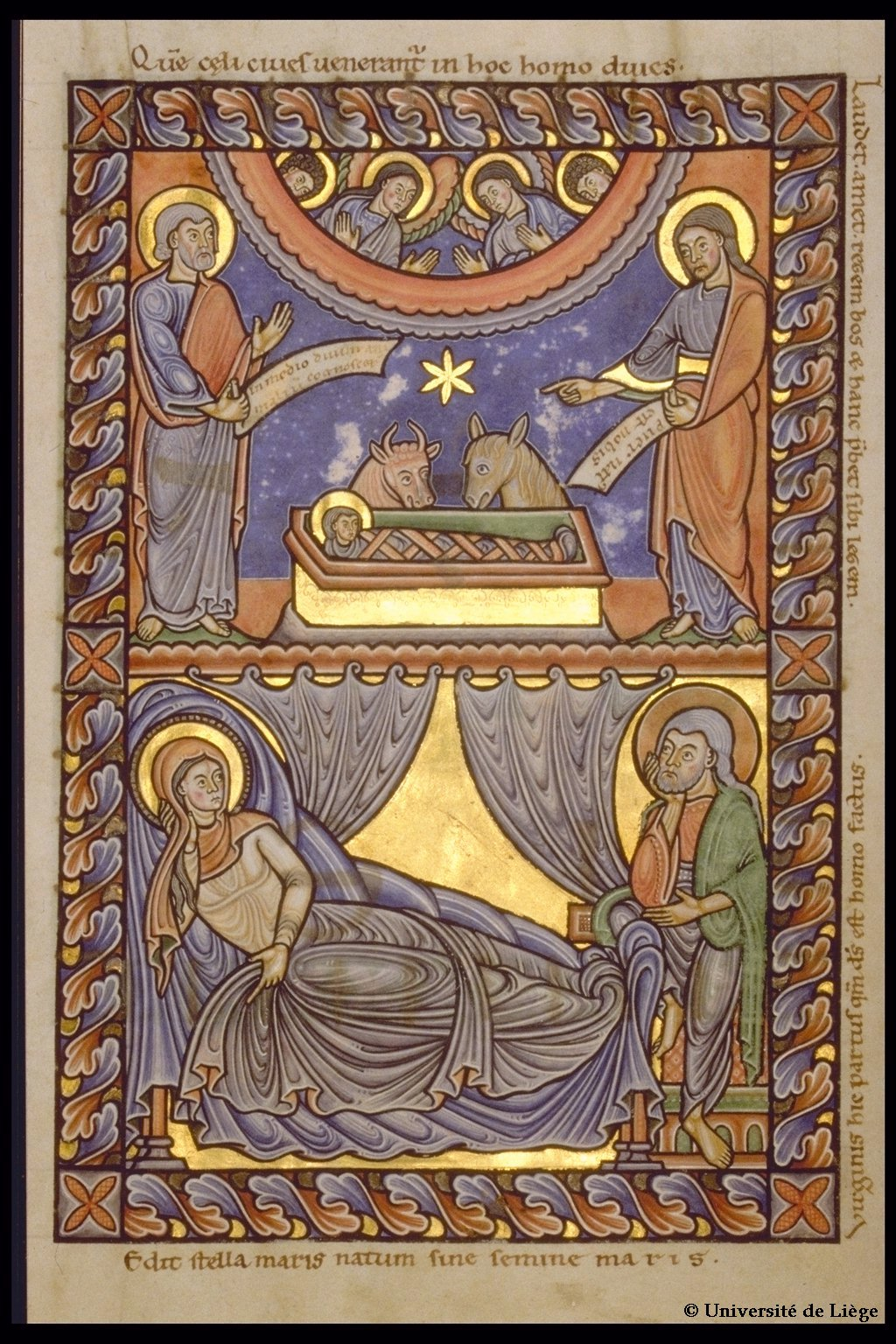
Evangeliary of Averbode, Liège University Library

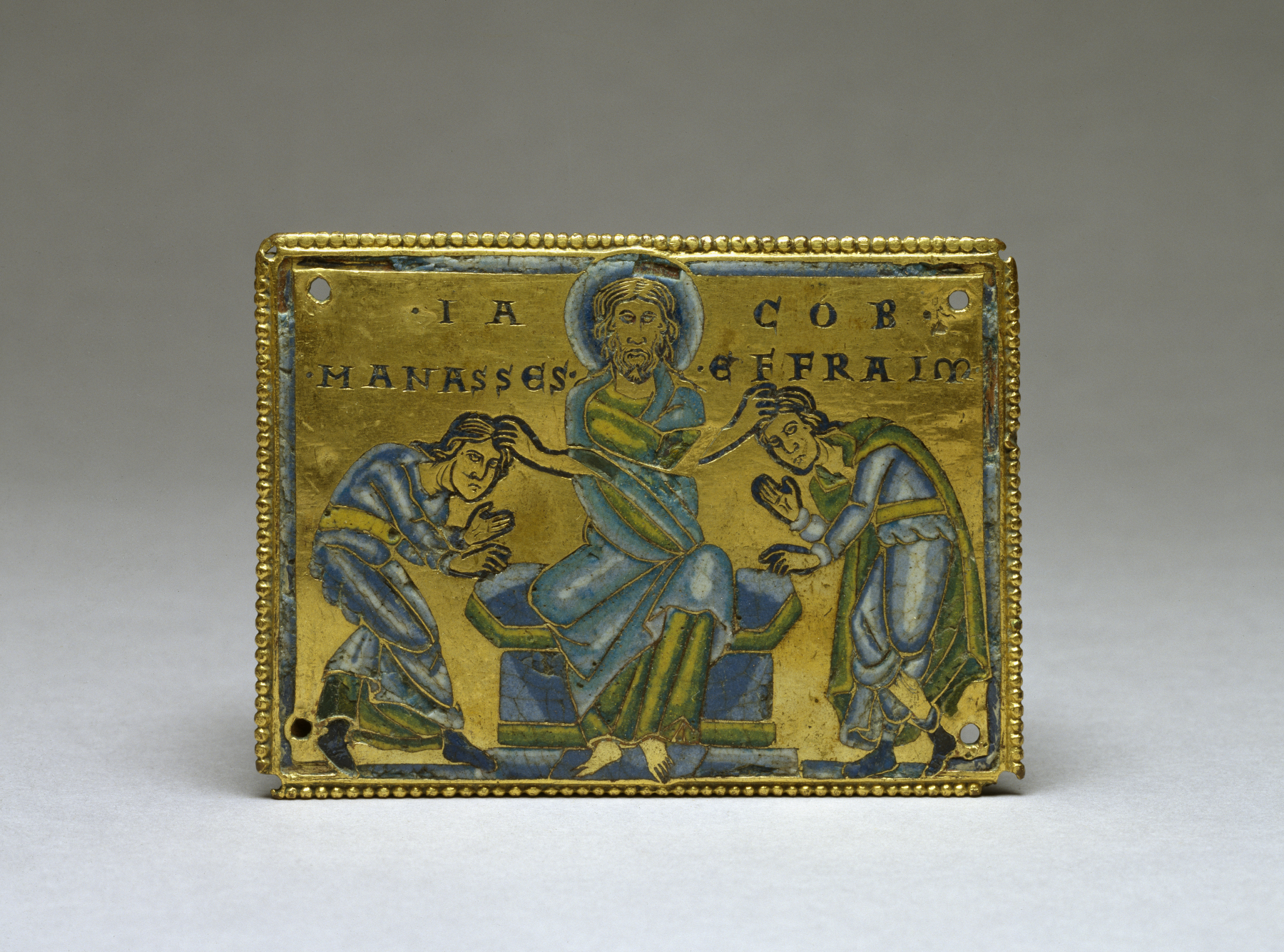
Jacob Blessing Manasses and Ephraim, champlevé enamel

== See also ==
- Romanesque art § Sculpture
- Mosan Renaissance architecture
- Tournai font
