= Reliquary of Pétermonostora =

Reliquary fragments from an archeological site in Hungary

- Mosan enamels from Pétermonostora, depicting the Ascension of Christ and the Washing of the Feet, c. 1170, 24.5 × 12.5 cm. Discovered at Pétermonostora, near Bugac, Hungary.
- Year: c. 1170
- Medium: Champlevé and Cloisonné enamel on gilded copper
- Dimensions: 24.5 × 12.5 cm
- Location: Katona József Museum of Kecskemét

The Reliquary of Pétermonostora is an ensemble of several Mosan ornamental fragments produced around 1170. Most important among these are the two large enamel plaques depicting the Ascension of Christ and the Washing of the Feet. The monastery housing the artwork was destroyed in 1241 during the First Mongol invasion of Hungary and it has been excavated in different campaigns since 2010. Apart from their art-historical importance, the discovery of the pieces is also important since it suggests strong connections with the monastic culture of Lotharingia and the Meuse Valley specifically. Given that the monastery was a private institution owned by the Becse-Gergely kindred, the artwork is also crucial for understanding the culture of such ecclesiastic foundations.

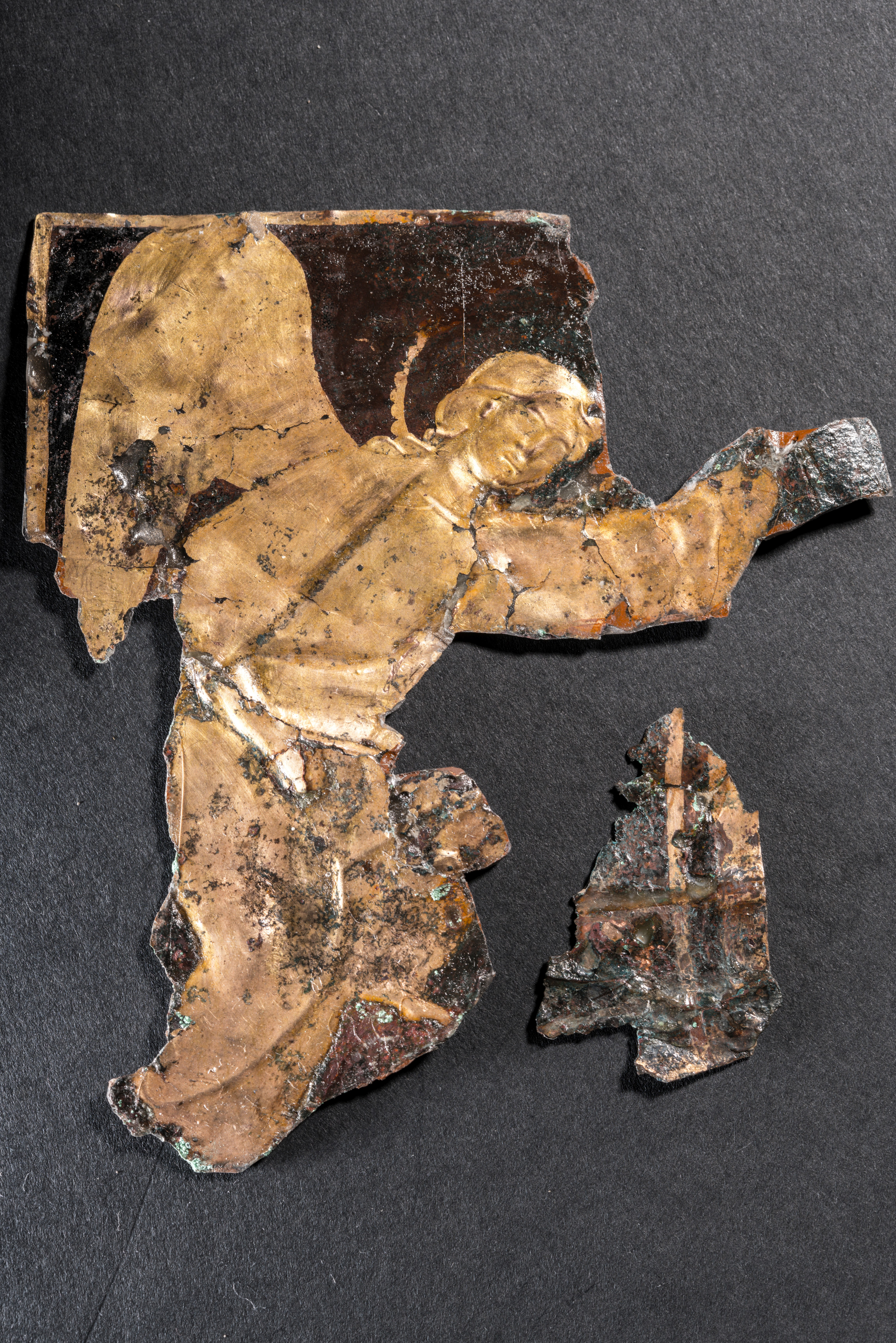
Embossed angel fragment with a mandorla from the back of the Pétermonostora reliquary.

== Discovery ==
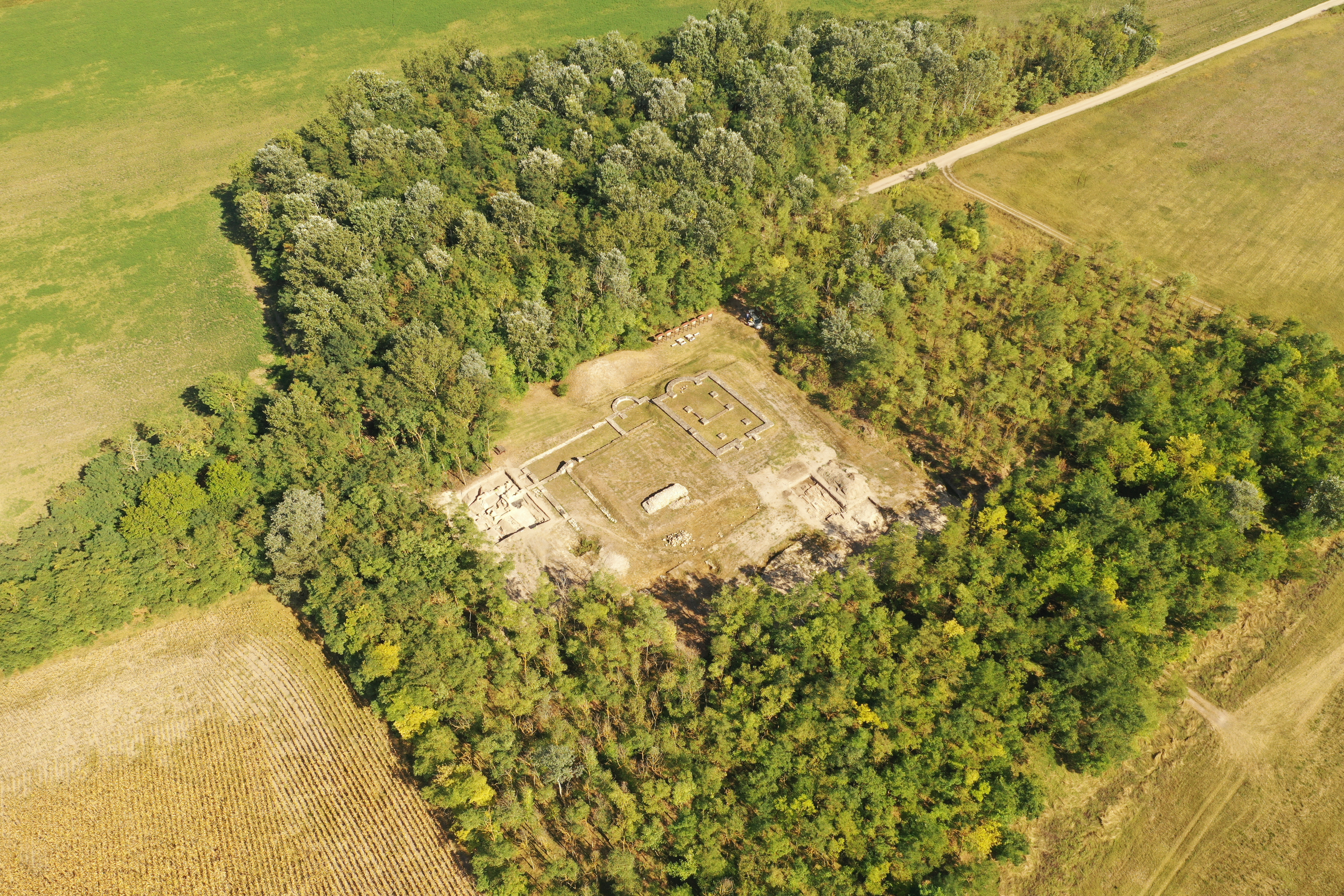
Aerial view of the Pétermonostora archaeological site near Bugac, Hungary, 2023.

Systematic excavations of the monastic complex of Pétermonostora (founded around 1130) were first carried out between 2010 and 2013. Szabolcs Rosta, the director of the Katona József Museum of Kecskemét, initiated these excavations. The destruction of the monastery can be clearly related to the Mongol invasion. This dates the destruction of the artworks and suggests that the artworks of the monastery ended up in the earth due to this devastating event. The discovery of the reliquary is remarkable because such outstanding artworks and extensive representatives of a church treasury are rare in similar archaeological contexts.

== Description ==
All the fragments were discovered in 2013, during the excavation of the interior of the church of Pétermonostora (“Peter’s monastery”). The two semi-circular enamel plaques are each 24.5 × 12.5 cm. On the left, in the plaque of the Ascension, three apostles can be seen, who are staring at the sky where angels are announcing the Ascension of Christ. The other plaque contains two scenes divided by an architectural background. The upper register shows Christ and Peter discussing the importance of the Washing of the Feet offered by Christ. The plaques are copper alloys, and their enamelling is mostly champlevé but, for some decorative elements, it is cloisonné. In addition to the two enamels, a gilded copper strip and an embossed angel both decorated with vernis brun – all discovered scattered across a few meters – seem to have belonged to the artwork, due to their stylistic resemblance and high quality.

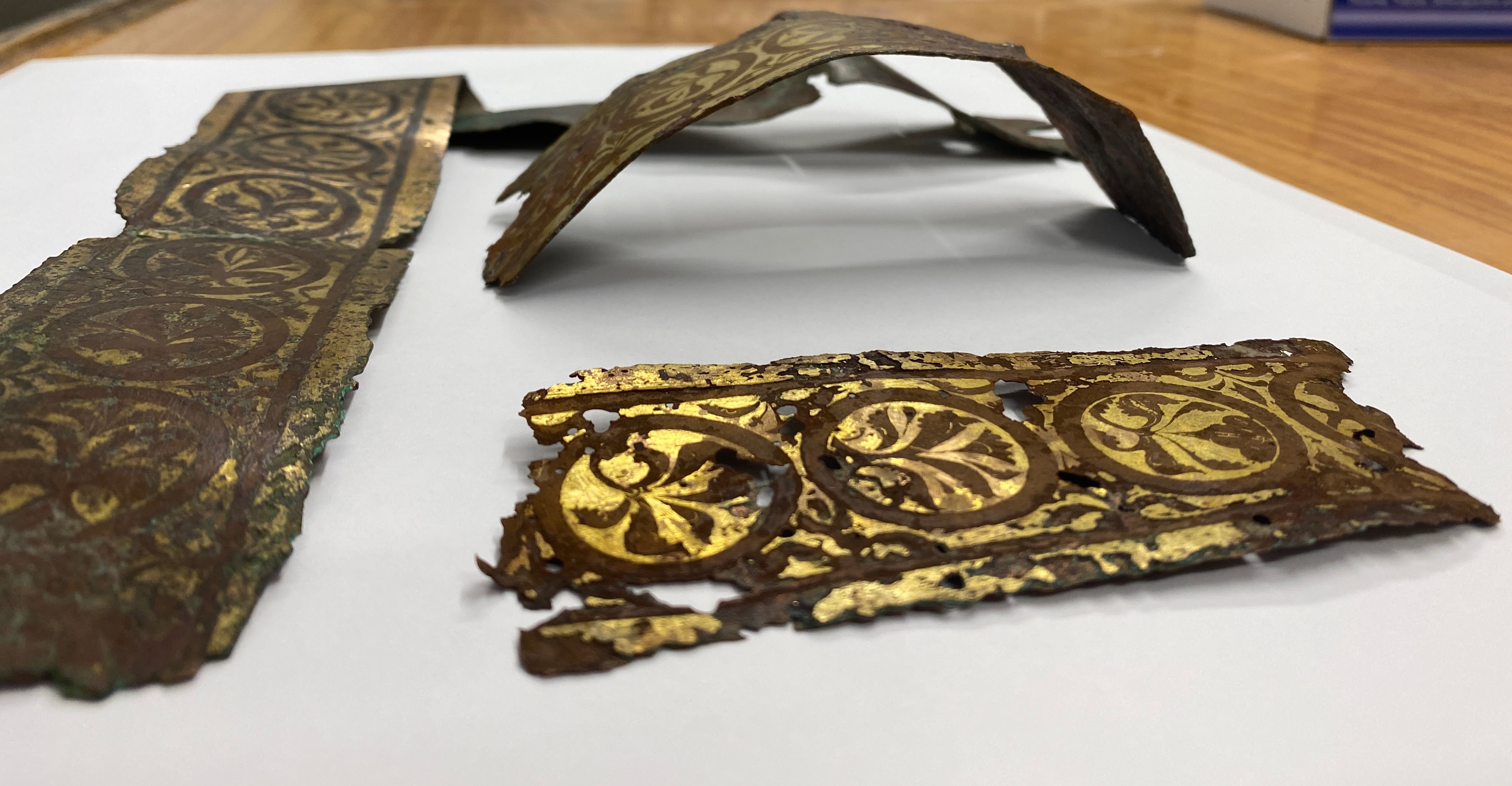
Fragments of the gilded side cover of the Pétermonostora reliquary.

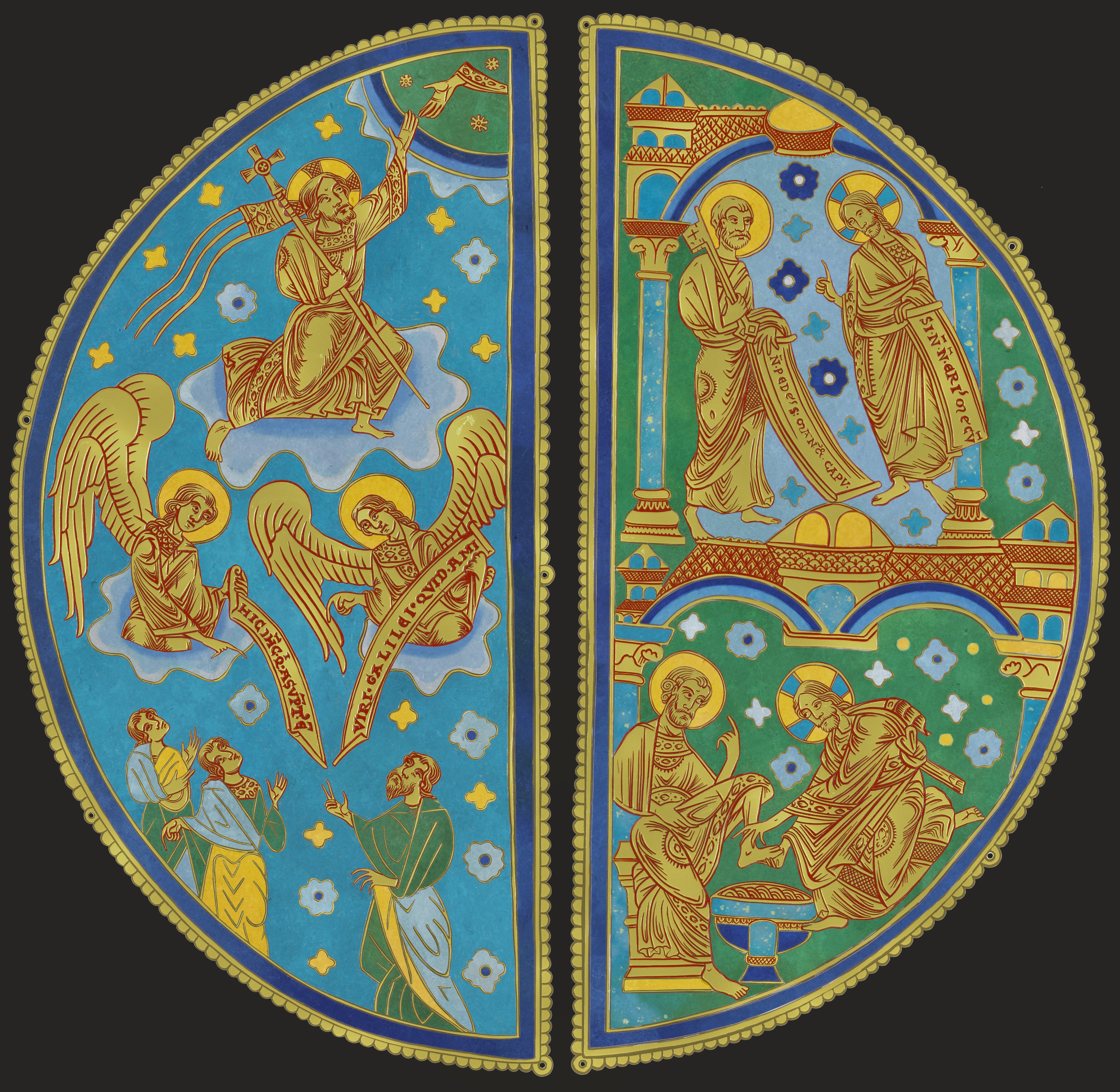
Reconstruction of the Mosan enamels of Pétermonostora.

== Artistic and historical significance ==
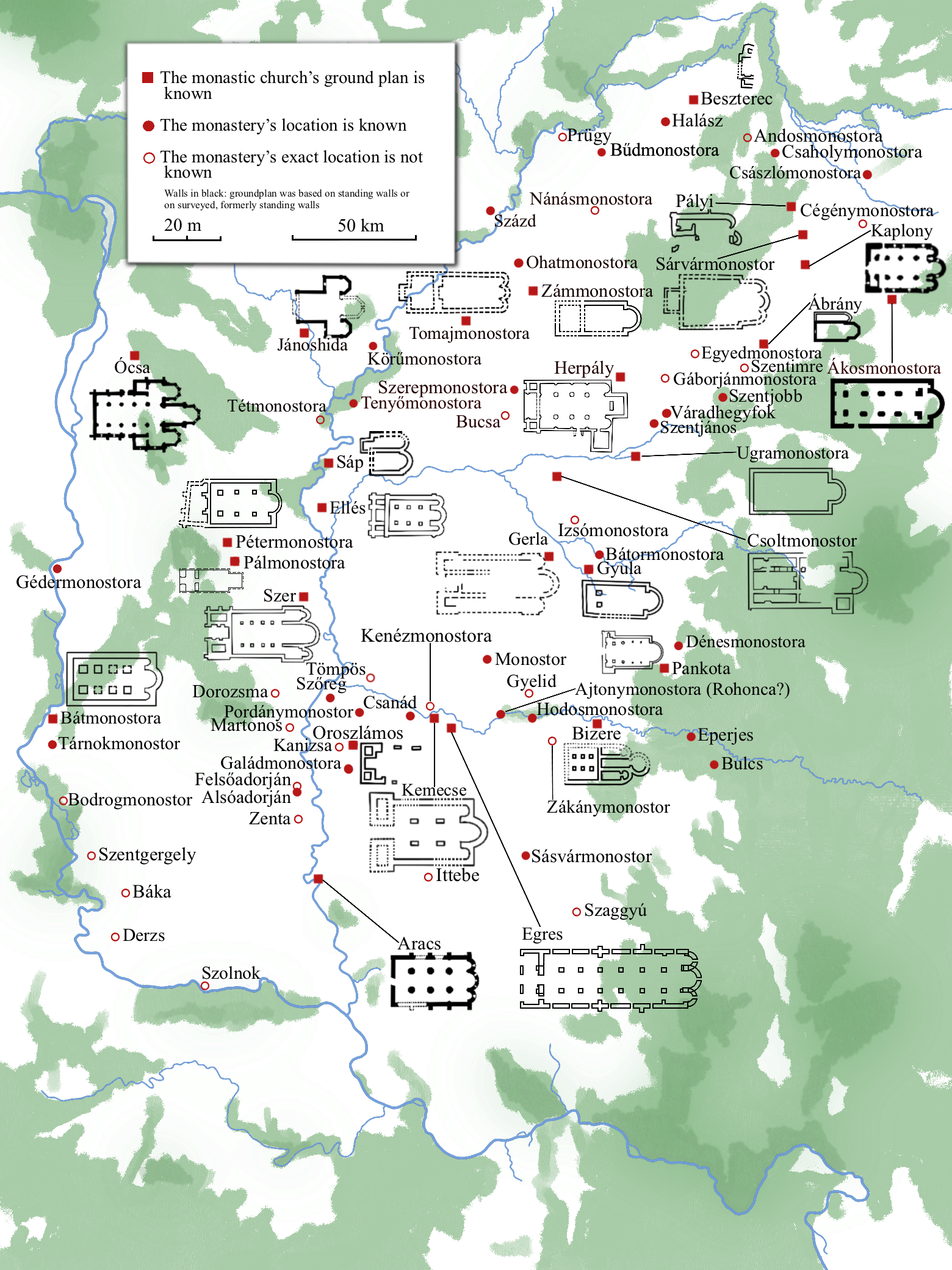
Map of monasteries on the Great Hungarian Plain during the Árpádian period.

The monastery’s wealth was clearly related to a branch of the Becse-Gergely kindred and seems to confirm their important position in the court of Béla III. The plaques show significant similarity to Mosan manuscripts and are also related to such artworks as the Stavelot Portable Altar and other notable Mosan pieces, such as fragments of Mosan phylactery in the British Museum. The artist of the Pétermonostora plaques was most likely trained in a Mosan environment and practiced there during the creation of the reliquary. The wealth and influence of the owners of the private monastery, the Becse-Gergely kindred, were certainly influential in the commissioning of the reliquary. However, the artwork’s arrival at the site is most probably the result of a monastic network connected to the influence of Liège as an intellectual center and perhaps to a monastic network reaching back to the Meuse Valley.

== Current location and restoration ==
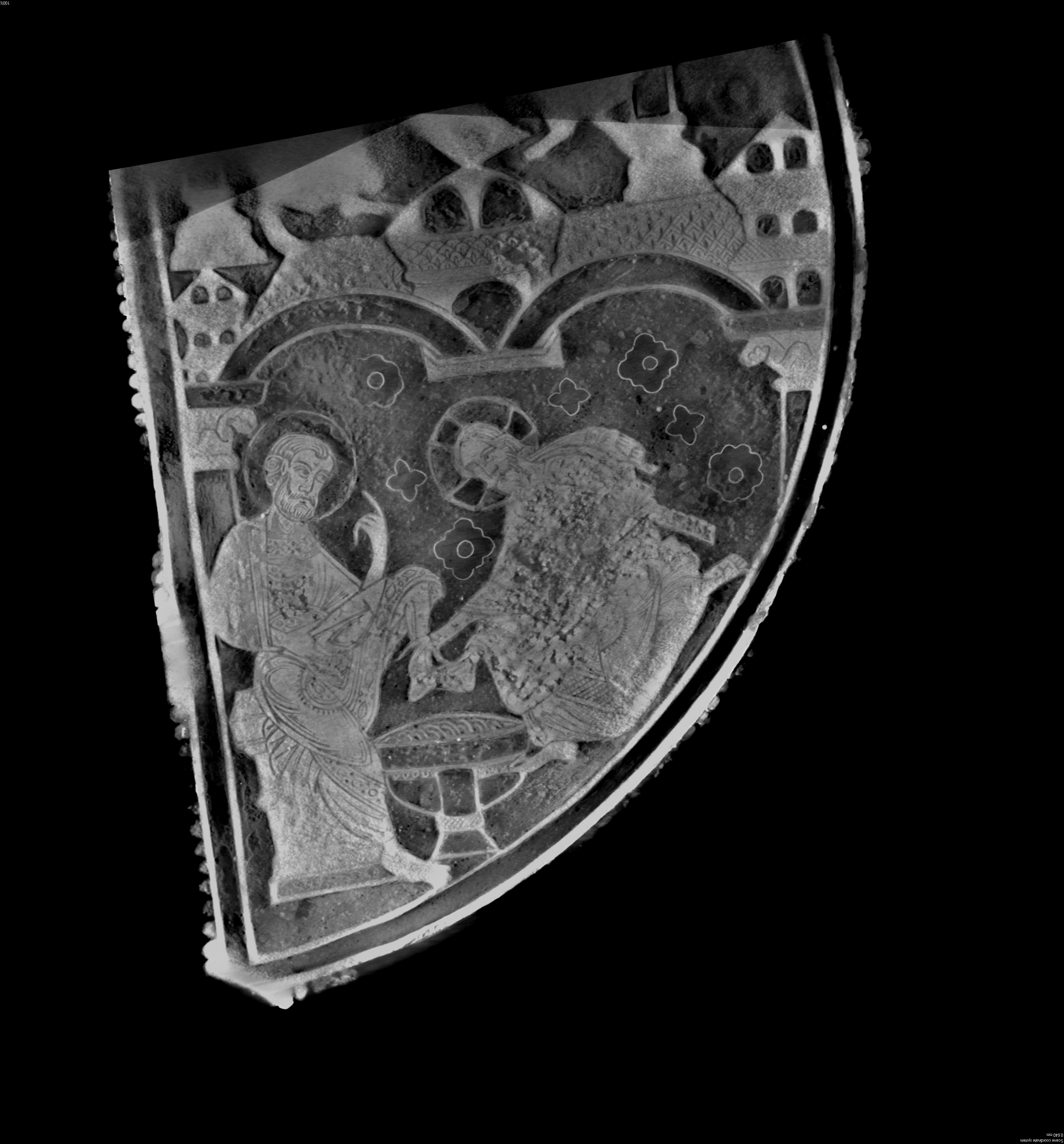
CT scan of the lower part of the Washing of the Feet plaque, revealing the damaged parts.

The fragments of the artwork are currently preserved in the Katona József Museum of Kecskemét (enamels and the side cover fragment) and in the visitors’ center near the archaeological site (the angel fragment). During their restoration, the pieces were examined with an industrial CT scan by Continental Automotive Hungary Ltd (now Aumovio), which revealed the compositions under the damaged areas of the Washing of the Feet plaque.
