= Maaseik =

Maaseik Mezeik (Limburgish)
- City and municipality
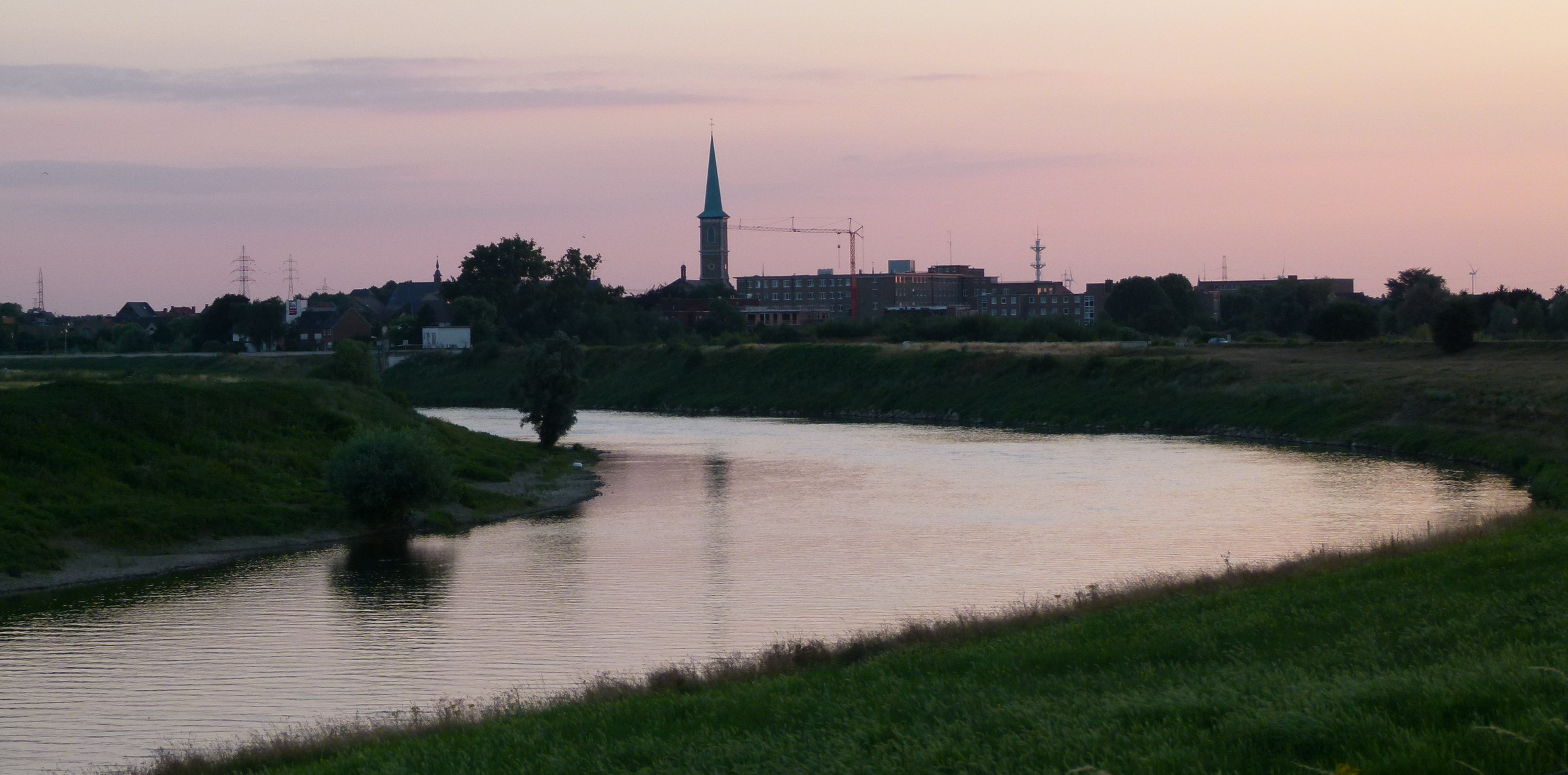
- Meuse river near Maaseik

- Flag Coat of arms

- Location of Maaseik in Limburg
- Interactive map of Maaseik
- Location in Belgium
- Coordinates: 51°06′N 05°48′E
- Country: Belgium
- Community: Flemish Community
- Region: Flemish Region
- Province: Limburg
- Arrondissement: Maaseik

Government
  - Mayor: Gunter Haeldermans
  - Governing parties: Open VLD, PRO3680, N-VA

Area
  - Total: 77.18 km^{2} (29.80 sq mi)

Population (2018-01-01)
  - Total: 25,201
  - Density: 326.5/km^{2} (845.7/sq mi)
- Postal codes: 3680
- NIS code: 72021
- Area codes: 089
- Website: www.maaseik.be

Maaseik (Dutch pronunciation: [ˈmaːsɛik]; Limburgish: Mezeik) is a city and municipality in the Belgian province of Limburg. Both in size (close to 77 km^{2}) and in population (approx. 25,000 inhabitants, of whom 3,000 non-Belgian), it is the 8th largest municipality in Limburg. The town is the seat of the administrative arrondissement of Maaseik (kieskanton). Internationally, Maaseik is known as the assumed birthplace of the famous Flemish painters Jan and Hubert van Eyck.

== Geography ==
The town of Maaseik is located on the left bank of the Meuse (Dutch: Maas), bordering the Netherlands. For this reason the river is called Grensmaas (for "border Meuse") here. Two smaller rivers, the Bosbeek (or Oeterbeek) and the Zanderbeek (or Diepbeek), flow into the Meuse near Maaseik. Because of its location in the Meuse valley, Maaseik has mostly fertile soils. The northwestern part of the municipality is situated on the plain of Bocholt and has less fertile soils.

The Meuse valley at Maaseik is about 4 kilometres wide. Maaseik has mostly been protected from floods by its slightly elevated position on a fluvial terrace. The riverbed has moved eastwards considerably over the centuries and has left several anabranches, meanders and oxbow lakes. An old anabranch of the Meuse (Oude Maasarm) can be seen in Heppeneert, a hamlet south of Maaseik. Deposition of sediments (mainly gravel, loam and clay) occurred on the inner edges of the meanders. For many decades gravel has been extracted from the area, resulting in a multitude of disused gravel pits, which have been mostly redesignated as nature reserves or watersports areas.

The Maaseik municipality includes the town of Maaseik and the sub-municipalities of Neeroeteren and Opoeteren. Smaller villages and hamlets include Aldeneik, Heppeneert, Wurfeld, 't Ven, Gremelslo, Berg, Schootsheide, Voorshoven, Waterloos, De Riet and Dorne.

== History ==
=== Etymology and origins ===
As its name would suggest, Aldeneik (possibly to be translated as 'old oak') is older than Maaseik ('Meuse oak'). Although most toponyms with the affix -eik refer to a landscape with oaks, it is also possible that it is derived from the German word Ecke, which means 'corner'. 'Old corner' or 'bend' may in that case be linked to the fact that historically, the Meuse formed a bend around Aldeneik. An oaktree, however, is present in the town's coat of arms, which includes three crosses (perhaps representing the three oldest parishes) and a fish (representing the river Meuse).

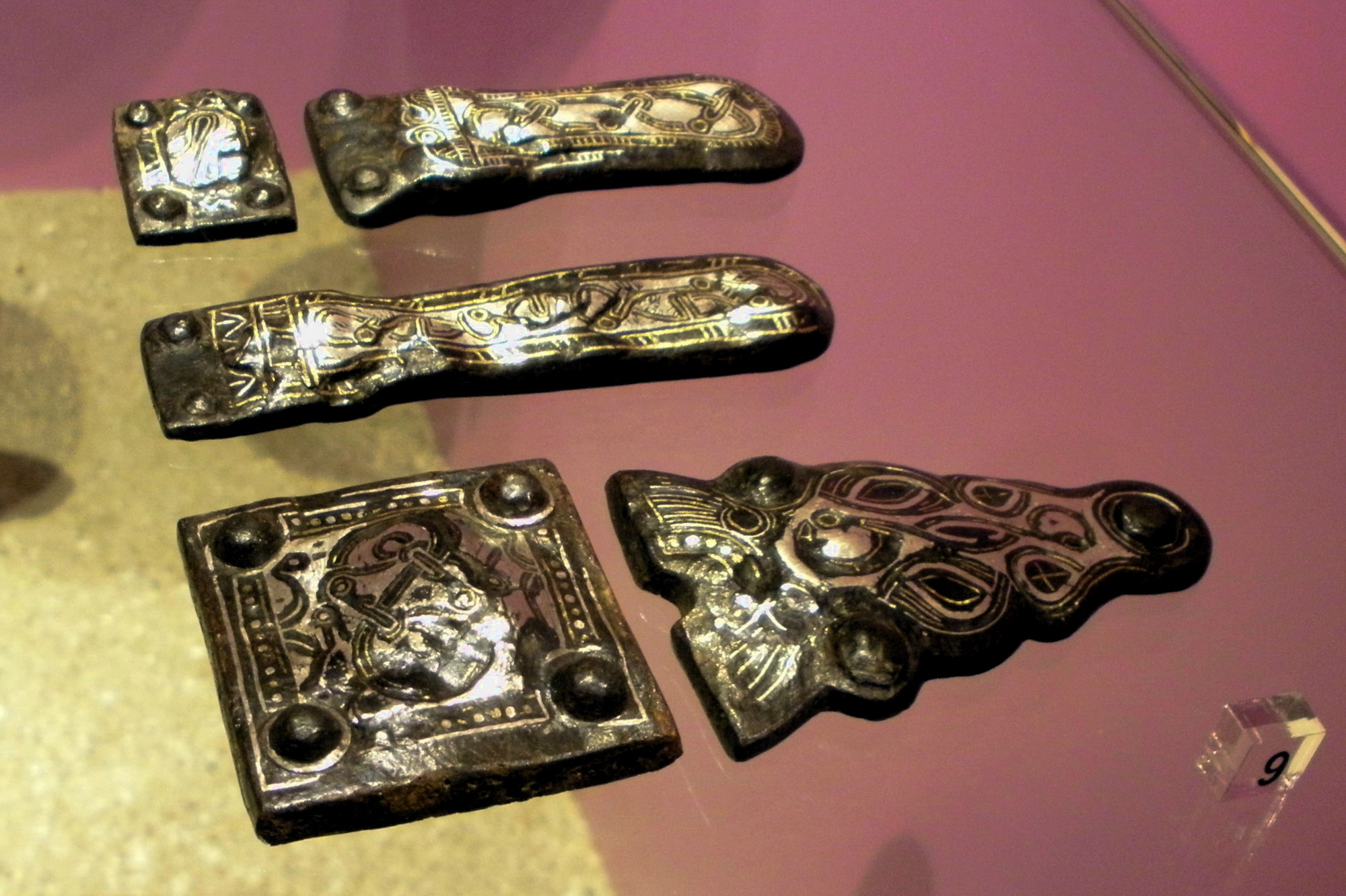
Merovingian belt buckles, from the early days of Aldeneik Abbey

According to tradition, Aldeneik Abbey was established by Adelard, a local Frankish lord, around 700 AD, as a Benedictine nunnery. His two daughters, Herlindis and Relindis, both became abbesses of the monastery and eventually became saints. The abbey at Aldeneik soon became the center of a small village community.

The abbey probably suffered destruction by the Vikings in the 9th century. Around 950, emperor Otto I gave the restored monastery to the bishop of Liège, who turned it into a religious chapter for (male) canons. The reason for this reform may have been that there were already several religious institutions for noble women in the area: Susteren Abbey, Thorn Abbey and Munsterbilzen Abbey. Aldeneik Abbey was abandoned at the beginning of the Eighty Years' War but the chapter continued in Nieuw-Eycke ('new oak'), now Maaseik.

=== Middle Ages ===
The town of Maaseik was probably founded around 1000, perhaps by the canons of nearby Aldeneik. It lay near the old Roman road that connected Maastricht and Nijmegen and was relatively safely situated in the valley of the Meuse. The settlement was originally part of the County of Loon. The village grew and became an important trading place in the Meuse region. Maaseik received its city charter in 1244. In the 14th century Loon was incorporated into the Bishopric of Liège and Maaseik became one of the 23 Liège Bonnes Villes.

As a typically planned town, the four main streets start at the marketplace and led to the four city gates, none of which has been preserved. The rectangular shape of the city walls is also typical. Against the western wall, a castle was built. The walls were dismantled however in 1467, when during the Liège Wars the Duke of Burgundy, Charles the Bold, attacked the Prince-Bishopric of Liège and destroyed many towns in the region.

=== 16th-18th century ===
Up till the 16th century Maaseik's economy was flourishing, thanks to commerce and the production of broadcloth. However, a large section of the population in these days were priests, canons, monks, nuns, beguines or beghards. Until the French Revolution, no fewer than six monasteries were present in the small town.

During the religious troubles of the 16th century, Maaseik was a stronghold for Anabaptism and almost broke away from Liège, but prince-bishop Gerard van Groesbeek was able to calm the people and retain the town.

Maaseik was besieged again in 1672 by Louis XIV. The walls, which had been rebuilt in the 16th century, were strengthened by Vauban during this period. The town suffered two disastrous fires in 1650 and 1684; the 1684 fire destroyed one third of the entire town which up till then largely consisted of wooden houses. After that the building of wooden houses was no longer permitted.

=== Modern period ===
After the French retreat in 1814, Maaseik became part of the United Kingdom of the Netherlands (1815–39). Effectively, the town, having sympathized with the Belgian Revolution, became a Belgian town in 1831.

The Industrial Revolution of the 19th century seems to have bypassed Maaseik. The town had lost its importance and did not experience much growth, which perhaps accounts for the survival of many houses from the 17th and 18th century. Until well into the 20th century, several farms were active within the city walls. The walls were gradually taken down in the course of the 19th and 20th century. Only a portion of the south section at Walstraat remains. Some street names recall the names of the old city gates (Bospoort, Maaspoort). In 2007, remains of a fortified tower were found during excavations for an underground parking garage.

A railroad built in the 19th century connected Maaseik to the provincial capital Hasselt, but fell into disuse and was removed around 1950; it now serves as part of a bicycle network in Belgian Limburg. In the early 20th century, a bridge was built over the Meuse, connecting Maaseik directly with the Netherlands. The bridge was destroyed several times during World Wars I and II. The present bridge was built in 1951 and replaced a temporary bridge built by American troops in 1944.

Today, Maaseik is mostly a regional centre for the surrounding communities with some small factories and businesses, shops, restaurants, a theater, schools, a court house and a hospital.

== Places of interest ==
In Maaseik many buildings are protected as Beschermd erfgoed (National Heritage Sites). Notable are several churches and monasteries, mostly in Baroque and Neoclassical style, and a large number of houses in the local Mosan style. Twelve watermills around Maaseik have been restored, some of which are still functioning and can be visited.

=== Churches, monasteries and listed houses ===
The main church of Maaseik is the Neoclassical Sint-Catharinakerk (Church of Saint Catherine), built in 1840–45. The predecessor of this church was for over 300 years the seat of a powerful religious institution, the chapter of Aldeneik, which was originally based at nearby Aldeneik Abbey, but in 1571 moved to Maaseik in order to escape the religious troubles of the period. The canons of Aldeneik took their treasures with them, which can now be seen in the sacristy of Saint Catherine's. In Aldeneik, all that remains of the once mighty abbey is the heavily restored Sint-Annakerk (Church of Saint Anne).

Several monasteries from the Baroque era have been preserved in Maaseik. The most notable once are the monasteries of the Franciscans, the Capuchins and the Holy Cross Canons. The latter church (Kruisherenkerk) has a Rococo interior.

Maaseik, although a small town, boasts of many listed houses, predominantly in Mosan Renaissance style. Most of the houses are built in brick in combination with soft, yellowish Limburg chalk and a much harder, blueish limestone from the Ardennes region, locally called Naamse steen (Namur stone). Along Markt, Bosstraat, Hepperstraat and Grote Kerkstraat several beautifully adorned Mosan gables can be seen, many with original gable stones.

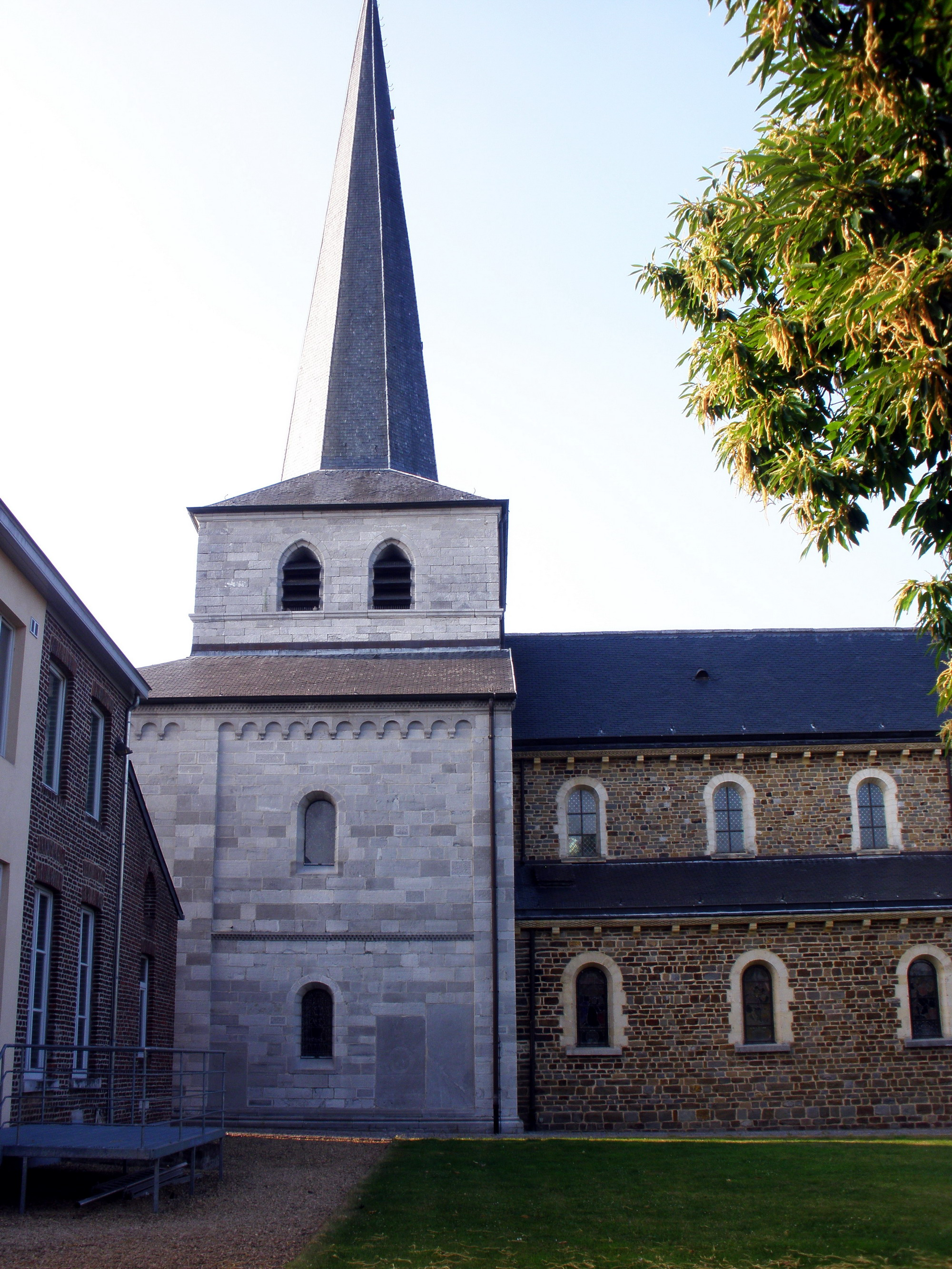
Saint Anne's Church, Aldeneik

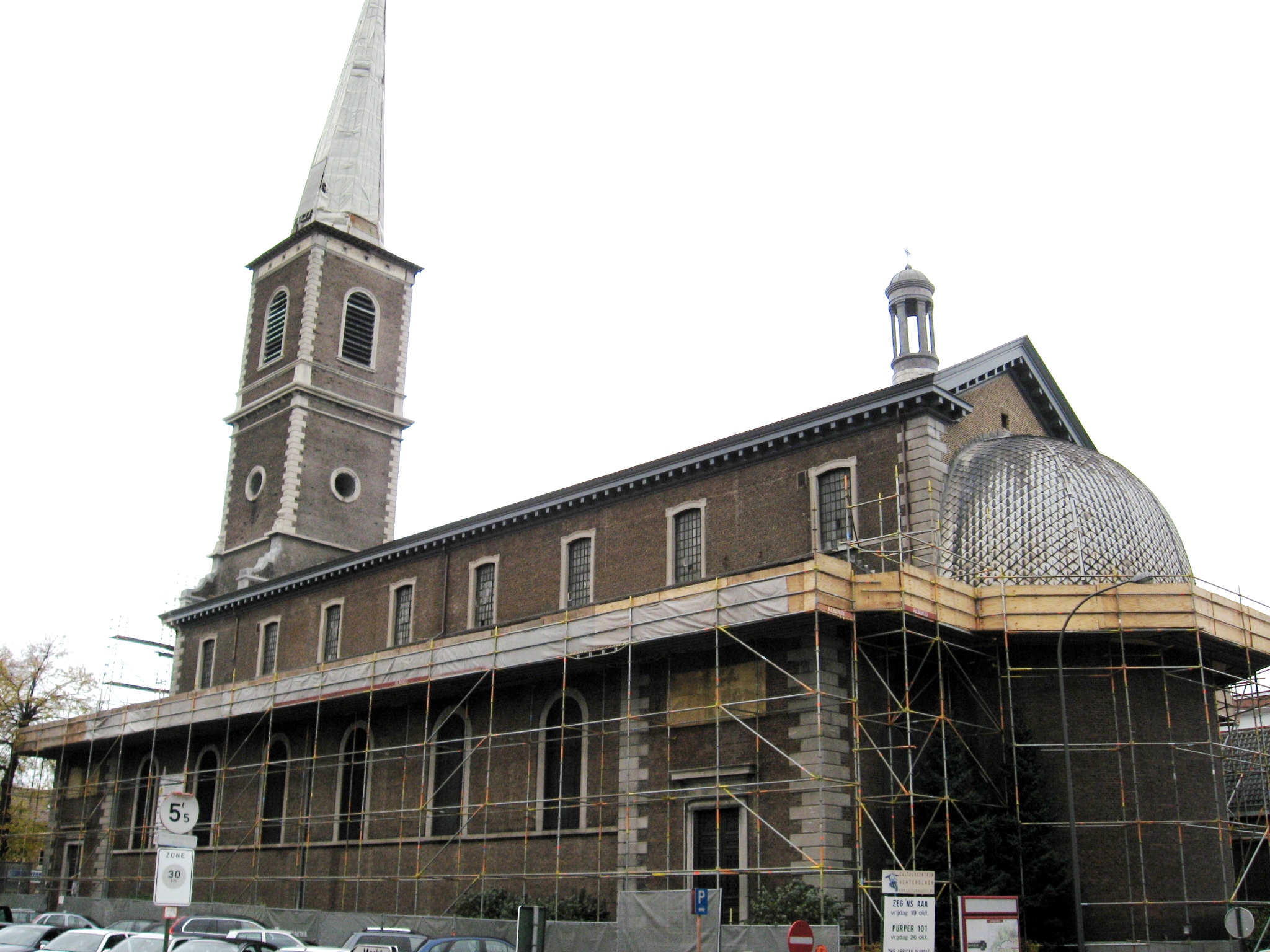
Saint Catharine's Church

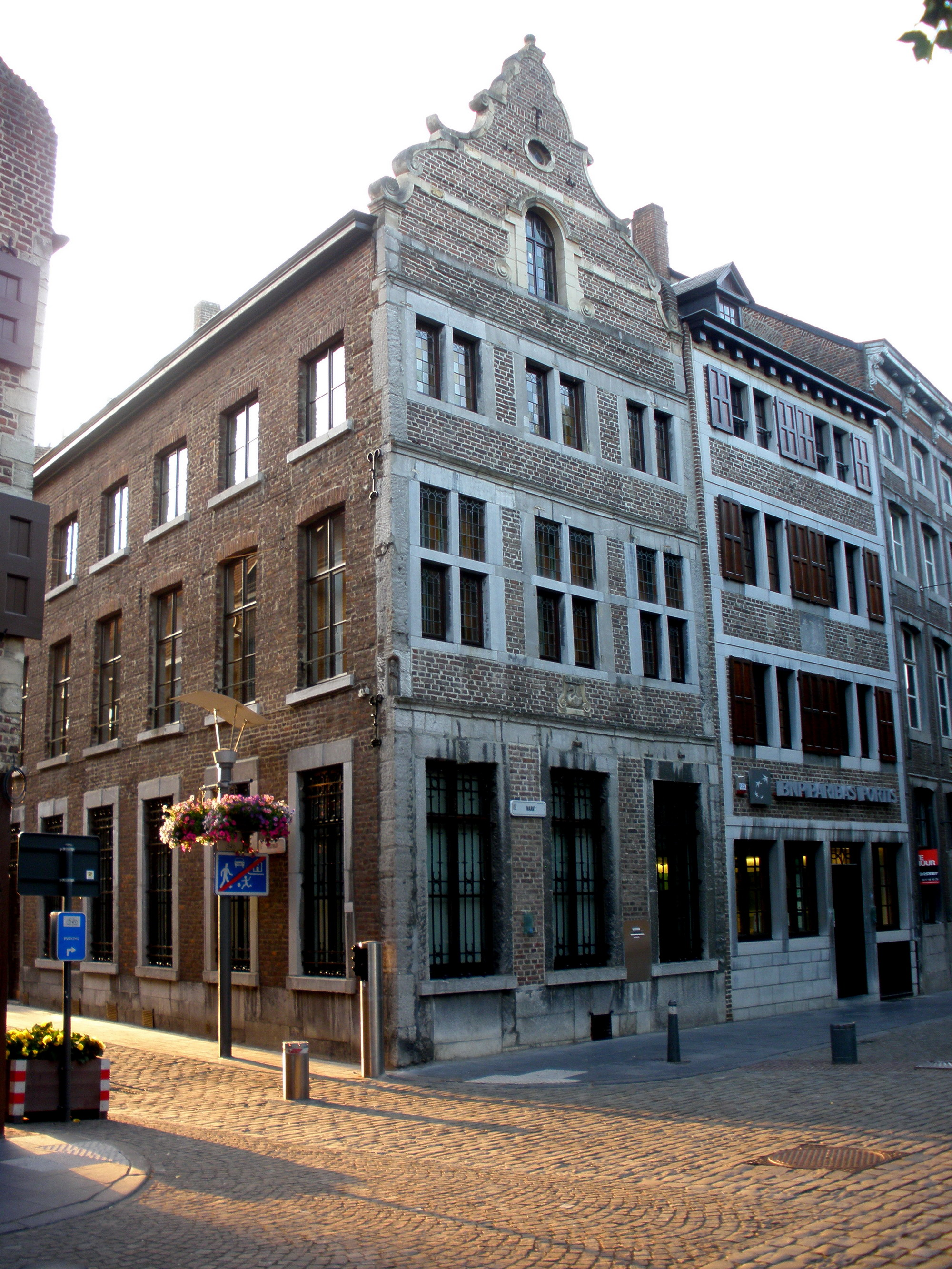
Corner building Markt-Bosstraat

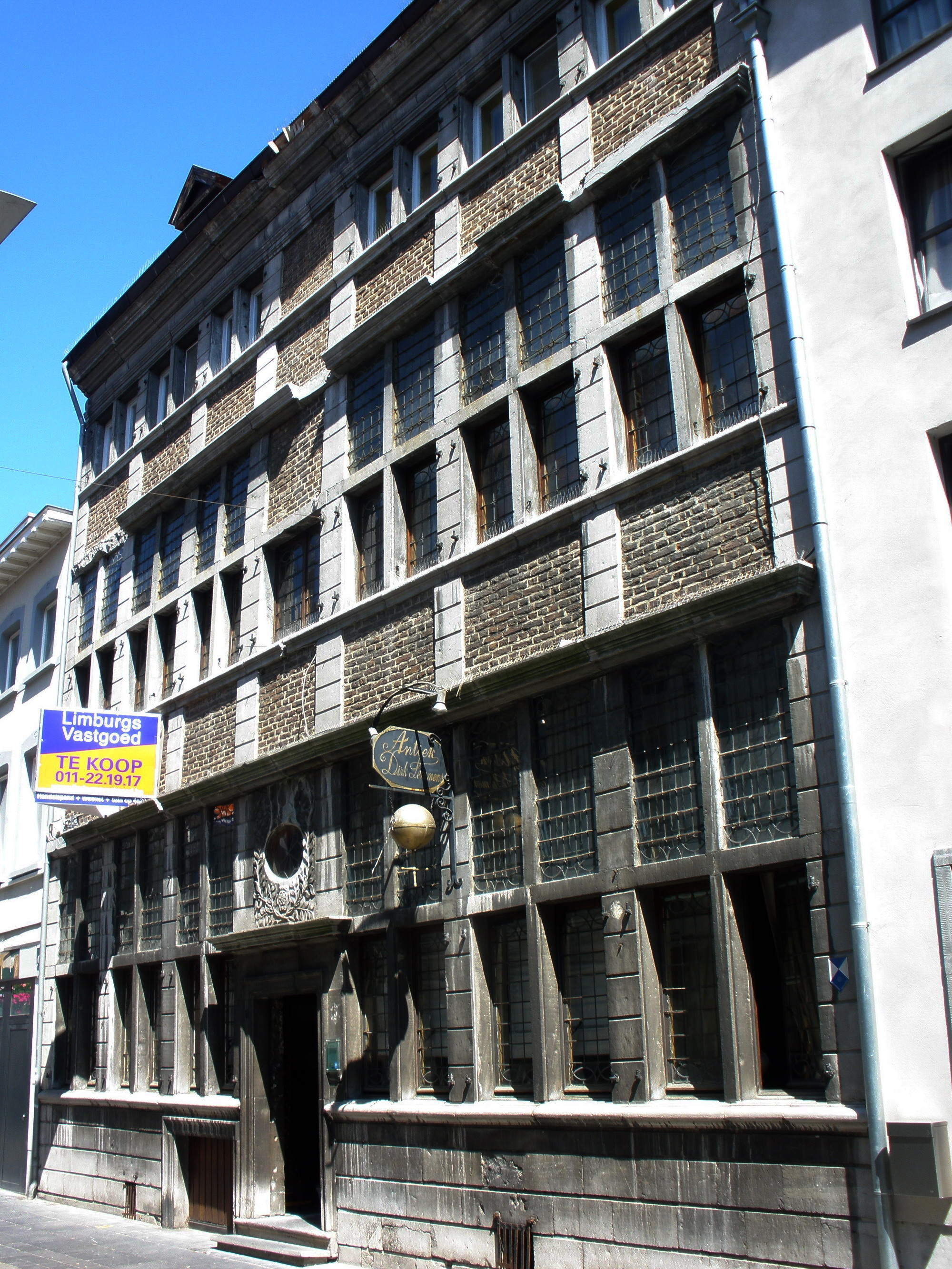
Bosstraat nr 7

=== Market square ===
The main square and the true centre of Maaseik is the Markt (Market Square) with the 19th-century statue of the town's famous sons, Jan and Hubert van Eyck. On the North side of the square is the 18th-century town hall and a copy of the old perron, the symbol of judicial freedom of the prince-bishopric of Liège, placed in front of the town hall. The market place is surrounded by old houses, some of which are medieval in core but with 17th or 18th-century gables. Several buildings have been converted into pubs and restaurants and although the tree-lined square is still partly used as a car park, in Summer a number of street terraces give it a lively atmosphere.

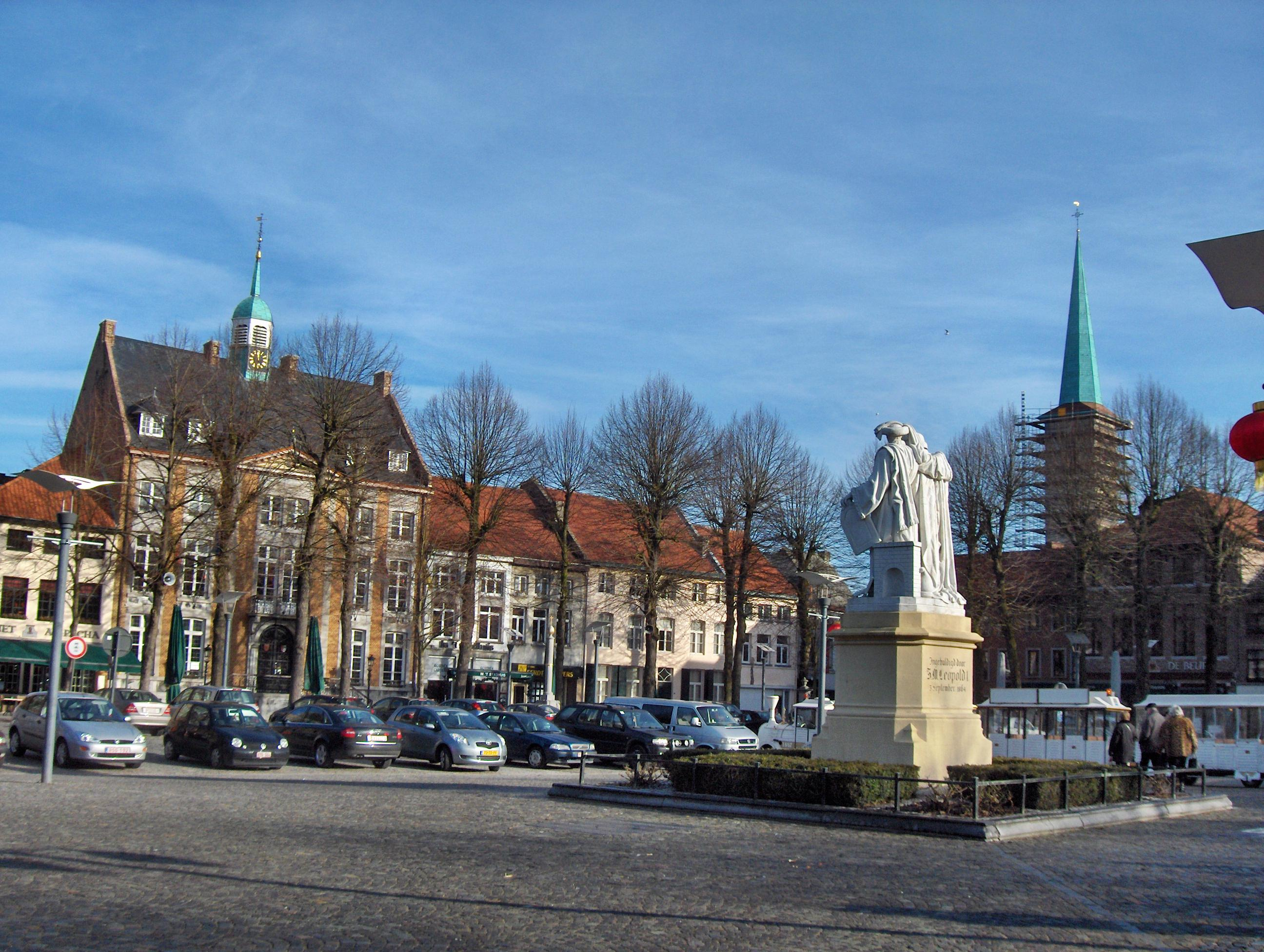
Maaseik market square

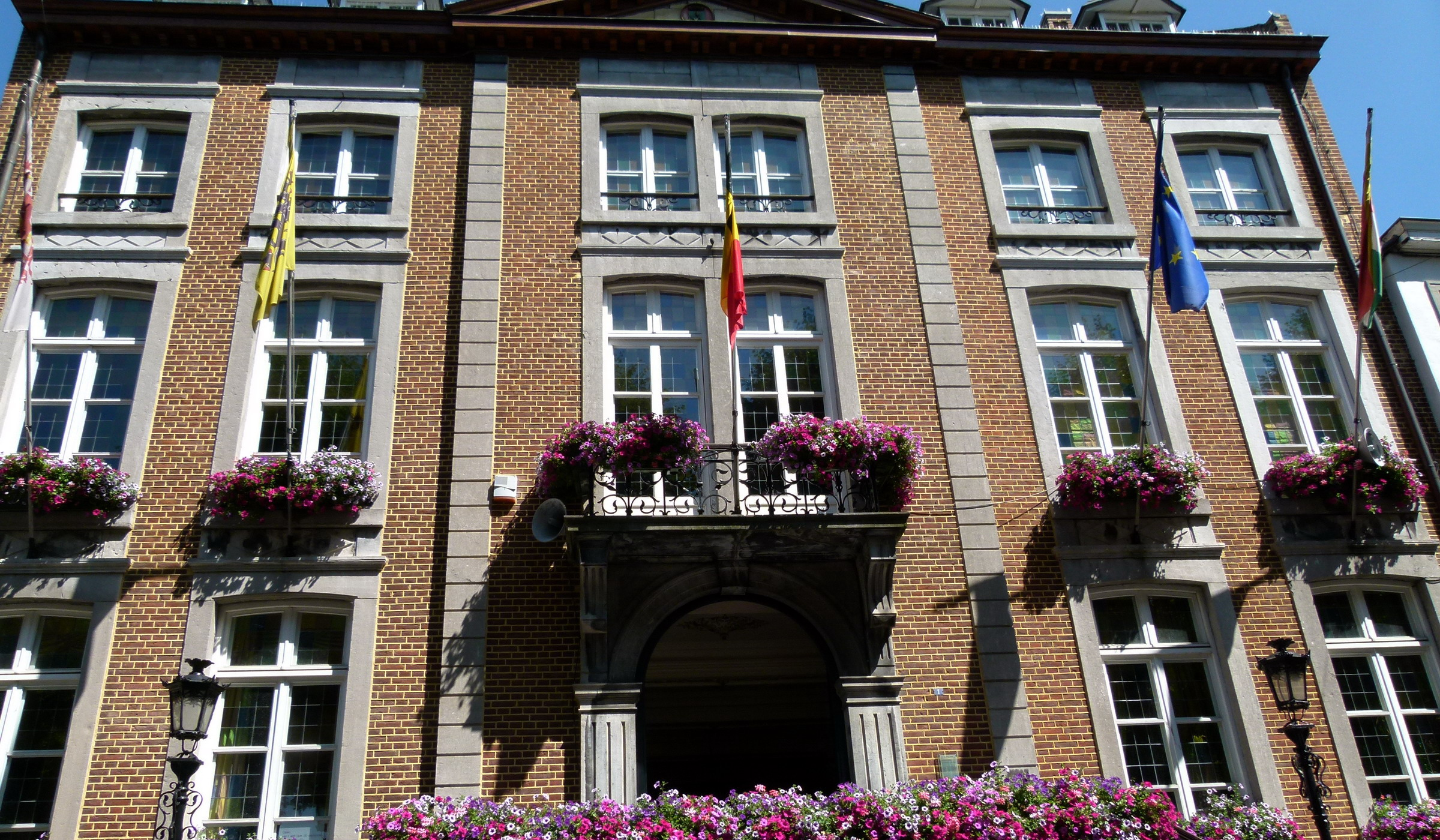
Town hall

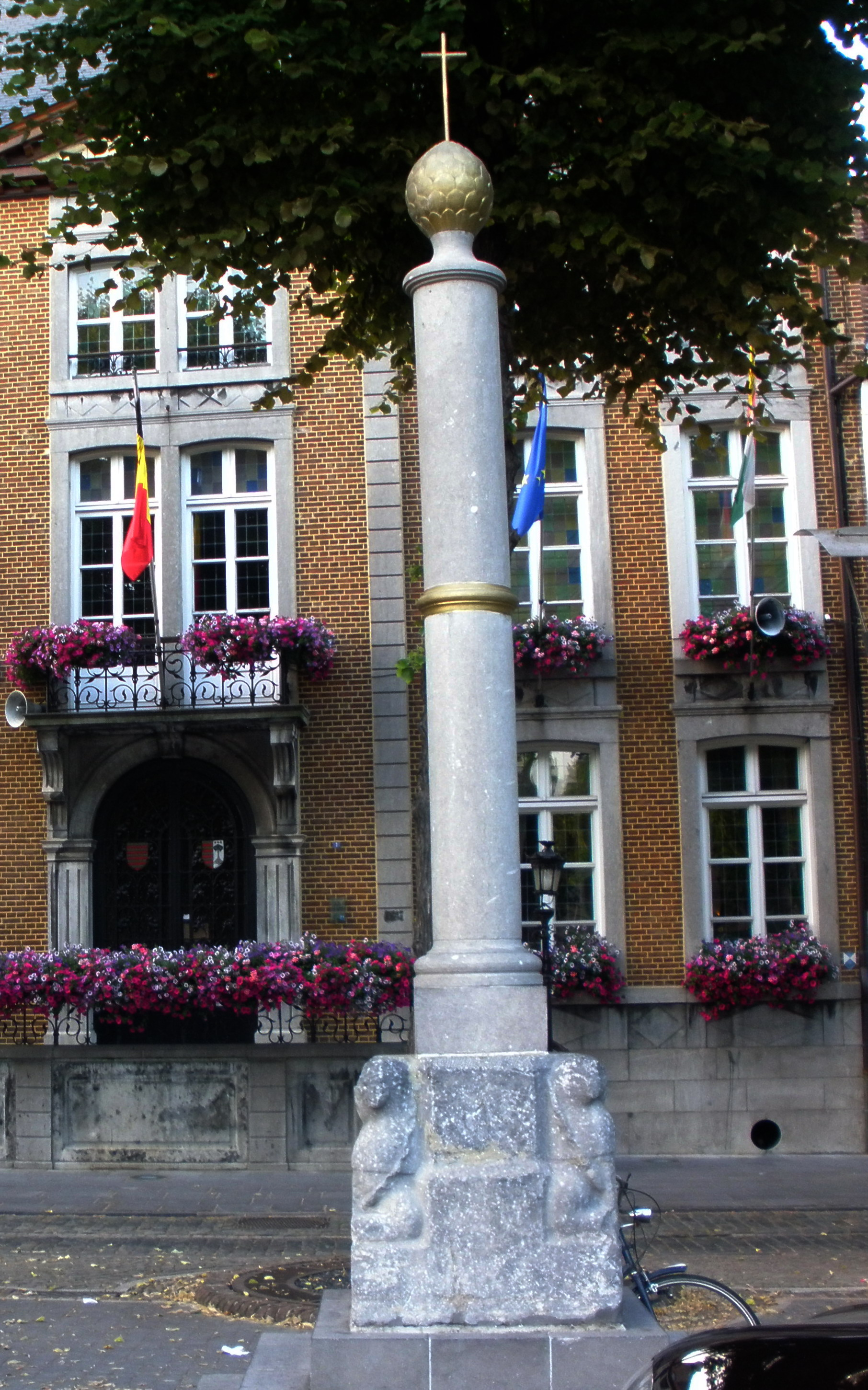
Liège perron

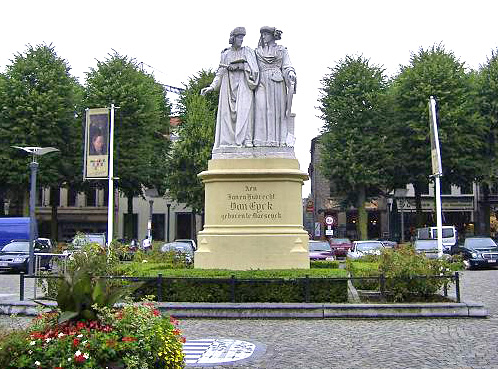
Van Eyck brothers

=== Museums ===
- The church of Saint Catharine houses an important church treasure, which was originally in Aldeneik, but was moved to Maaseik in 1571 when the canons of Aldeneik fled to the safety of the walled town. The church treasury holds the oldest Gospel Book of the Benelux, the Codex Eyckensis, which dates from the early 8th century. The church treasure also includes ancient textiles, some of which are described as garments belonging to the local saints Herlindis and Relindis, and the oldest known embroidered Anglo-Saxon textiles from the 7th, 8th and 9th century. Other treasures in the museum collection are reliquaries, some dating back to the 9th and 10th century, liturgical vessels made of gold and silver, paraments, and ancient manuscripts.
- The Regionaal Archeologisch Museum (RAM) on Markt includes a museum of regional archeology and local history, and a pharmacy museum. The latter is considered the oldest pharmacy in Belgium and has retained most of its original display of Delftware pots and tin jars. Behind the museum is a small herbal garden.
- In the nearby Franciscan monastery the privately owned John Selbach Museum displays collections of art and antique dolls. The building also houses a permanent exhibition about the Van Eyck brothers and a scale model of the town as it was in 1672. The building is also used for large-scale exhibitions (in 2008 the Terracotta Army of Xi'an and in 2012 treasures from the Tang dynasty).
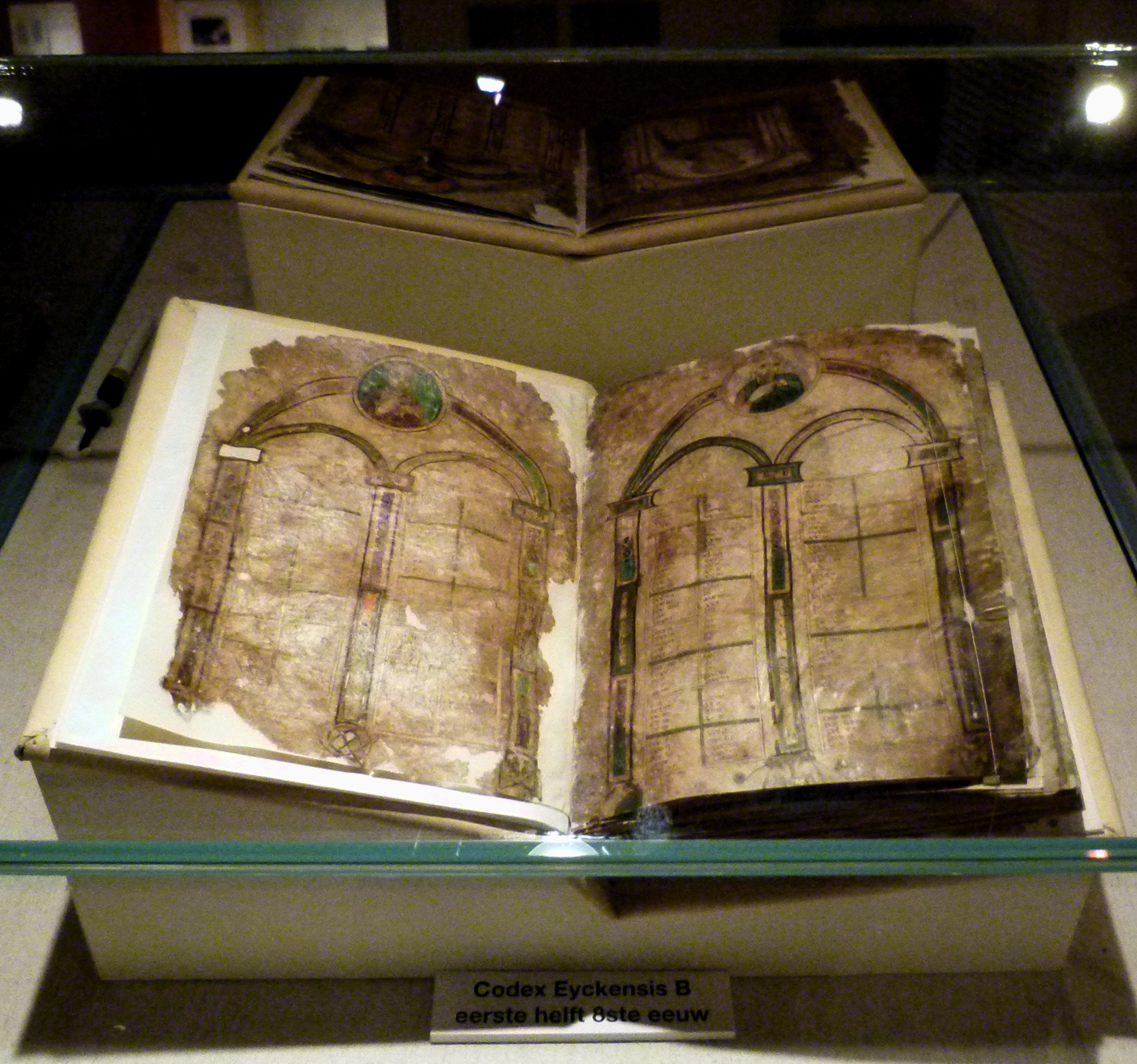
Codex Eyckensis

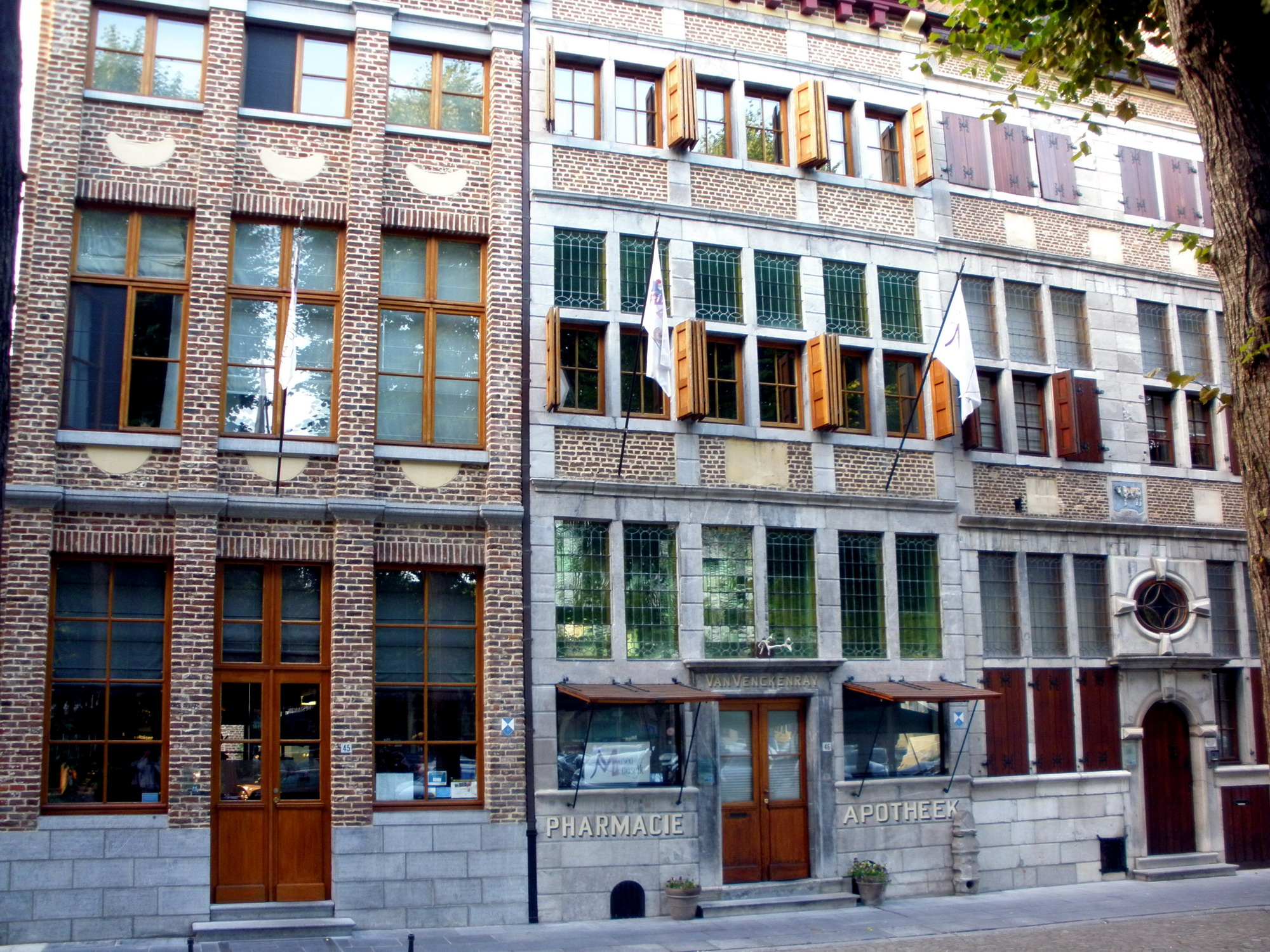
Archeological museum and old pharmacy

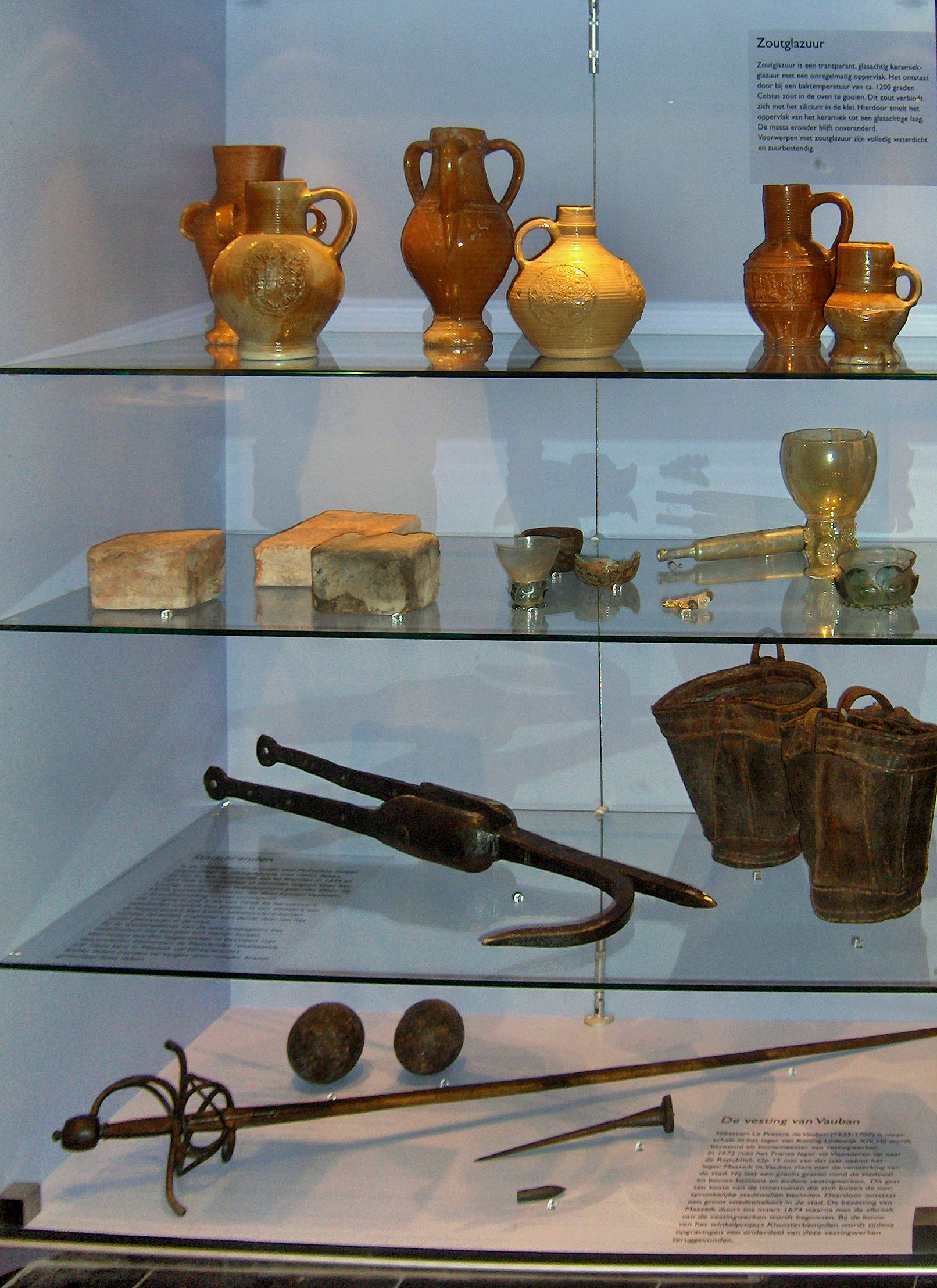
Display at archeological museum

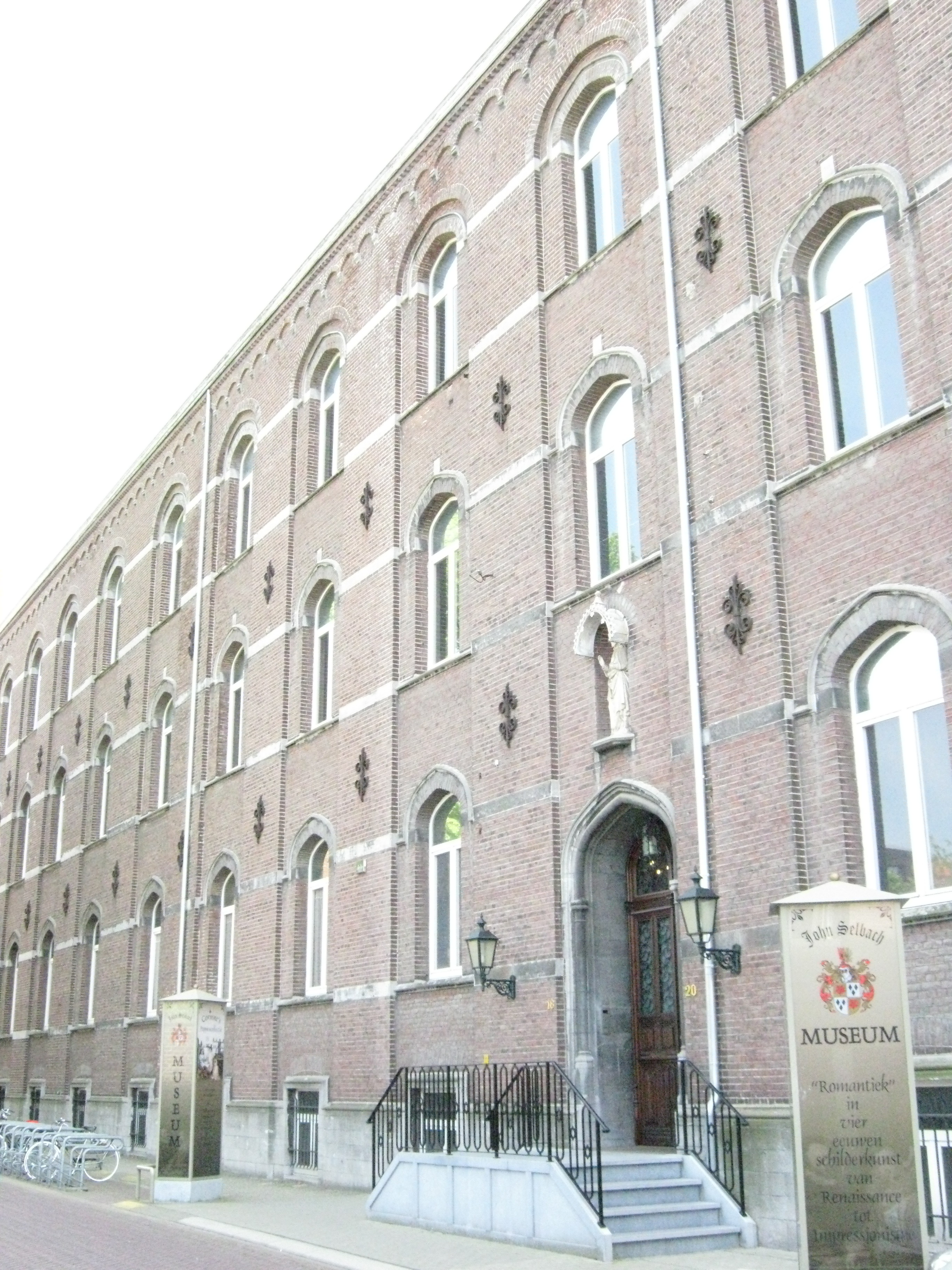
John Selbach Museum

== Politics ==
=== City council ===
The current city council was elected in the 2018 Belgian local elections. These elections have resulted in a takeover from former opposition party Open VLD who formed a coalition with PRO3680 and N-VA, ousting CD&V from the majority for the first time this century. The new coalition is led by mayor Johan Tollenaere

Party	Seats
Open Flemish Liberals and Democrats (Open Vld)	8
Christian Democratic and Flemish (CD&V)	7
Socialist Party Differently (PRO3680)	6
New Flemish Alliance (N-VA)	4
Flemish Interest (VB)	5
Total	29

== Notable people of Maaseik ==
- Saint Herlindis (d. 745), abbess and saint
- Saint Relindis (d. 750), sister of Herlindis, abbess and saint
- Hubert van Eyck, (ca.1366 – 1426), painter, thought to have been born in Maaseik .
- Jan van Eyck (ca.1385 – 1441), painter, thought to have been born in Maaseik .
- Johann Campanus (ca.1500 - ca.1575), Anabaptist preacher and religious reformer
- Patrick Damiaens (born 1966), woodcarver
- Jürgen Conings (1974-2021), corporal in Belgian Air Component, shooting instructor, terrorist

=== Sport ===
- Harry Everts (born 1952), 1975 motocross world champion
- Vital Borkelmans (born 1963), football fullback
- Vital Heynen (born 1969), volleyball player and coach
- Sandra Stals (born 1975), 800m athlete; 2000 European Indoor Championships bronze medallist
- Kristof Vliegen (born 1982), tennis player
- Max Verstappen (born 1997), four-time Formula One drivers champion
- Kristof Downer (born 1975), lived in Maaseik 1975-1998 and played right back for KMFC.

== Twin cities ==
- Germany: Wegberg
- Netherlands: Echt-Susteren, across the Meuse
