= Saint Amelia =

Saint Amelia (Amalberga, Amelberga) may refer to:

- Amalberga of Maubeuge, 7th-century Frankish nun and saint (July 10)
- Amalberga of Temse, 8th-century Lotharingian noblewoman and saint (July 10 or October 27)
- Amelberga of Susteren, 9th-century Dutch nun and saint (November 21)

== See also ==
- Amalaberga, queen of the Thuringii
