= Amelberga of Susteren =

Saint Amelberga of Susteren was the Benedictine abbess of Susteren Abbey, Netherlands in the 9th century AD; she died about 900 AD.

The date of c. 900 correlates to the tradition that Amelberga raised the three daughters of Zwentibold, King of Lorraine. The first record of the veneration of Amelberga comes from a relic inventory of the monastery of 1147 which included a drinking cup from Amelberga, with a later inventory (1668) also including part of Amelberga's skull wrapped in silk. In the 18th century inventory there was a silver goblet with gilded bowl from which sufferers of sore throats could drink beer.

Her remains are kept in the former abbey church in Susteren, which was dedicated to her in the 19th century. Her feast is celebrated on November 27.

== See also ==
- Amalberga of Temse
- Amalberga of Maubeuge
