= Van Susteren =

- Language: Dutch

Origin
- Meaning: "From Susteren"
- Region of origin: Limburg, Netherlands

Van Susteren is a toponymic surname, literally meaning "from Susteren".

Notable people with the surname include:

- Greta Van Susteren (born 1954), American television news anchor
- Lise Van Susteren (born 1951), American forensic psychiatrist
