= Honour Badge of Labour =

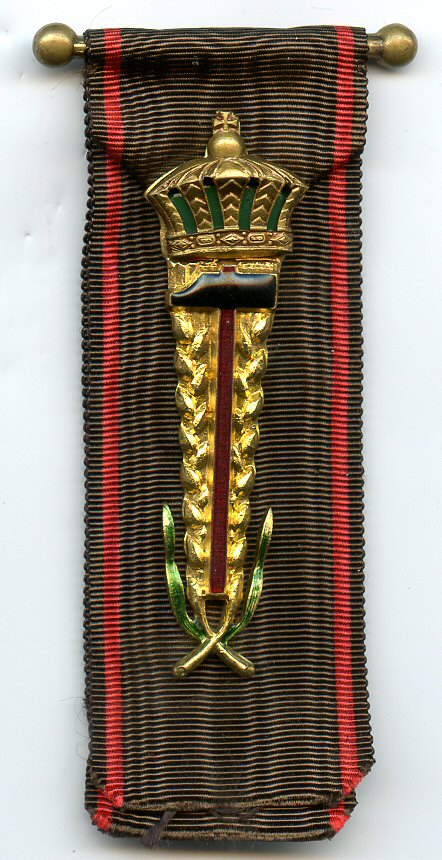
- Honour Badge of Labour (1948-63 variant)
- Type: Labour award
- Awarded for: Especially meritorious work, skills and commitment to a profession
- Presented by: Kingdom of Belgium
- Eligibility: Workers employed in Belgium
- Status: Active
- Established: 12 November 1948

The Honour Badge of Labour (Dutch: Ereteken van de Arbeid, French: Insigne d'Honneur du Travail) is a Belgian award aiming at rewarding especially meritorious workers for their skills and commitment to their profession. It is awarded by Royal Decree on a proposal from the Royal Institute of the Elites of Labour (Koninklijk Instituut der Eliten van de Arbeid in Dutch, Institut Royal des Elites du Travail in French). The award was officially created in 1948 on the basis of earlier badges awarded to meritorious workers during labour fairs as early as 1847.

== Classes ==
The Honour Badge of Labour is issued in five classes:

- The title of Honour Dean of Labour, awarded by their peers to a limited number of exceptionally noteworthy individuals between forty-five and sixty-five, practicing their profession for at least twenty years, and embodying the values, traditions and moral and social prestige of their profession. The Honour Deans of Labour are the representatives of their profession for a period of five years after they are awarded the title.
- The Gold Honour Badge of Labour, awarded to workers having been awarded the Silver Badge at least five years earlier, having a recognized professional competence, and actively involved in the social and professional development of their profession, such as leading training programmes or trade unions.
- The Silver Honour Badge of Labour, awarded to workers having been awarded the Bronze Badge at least five years earlier, having proven their willingness to broaden their professional qualifications and to anticipate the evolutions of their profession, and contributing to well-being in the workplace.
- The Bronze Honour Badge of Labour, awarded to workers older than thirty having proven their skills in the daily performance of their profession during more than ten or fifteen years (depending on the profession) and having demonstrated a commitment to professional and personal development.
- The Star of Cadet of Labour, awarded to workers younger than thirty having worked for at least three years and showing early signs of dedication to their profession.

The award of the Honour Badge of Labour also grants the awardee the title of Laureate of Labour (Laureaat van de Arbeid in Dutch, Lauréat du Travail in French).

== Insignia ==
The ribbon of the Honour Badge of Labour is dark brown (to represent the earth) with one thin vertical orange stripe on each side (representing fire). In addition, the ribbon of the Silver Badge has a thin silver stripe on the inside of each orange stripe. This stripe is gold for the ribbon of the Gold Badge.

The insignia of the Honour Badge of Labour shows a vertical hammer with one ear of corn on each side enamelled in black, yellow and red, and topped by a royal crown, which is bronze, silver or gold depending on the class of the award.

The Honour Deans of Labour wear a collar the color of the ribbon and adorned with golden badges showing a lion's face. The insignia suspended from the collar is a hammer enamelled in red and black with two ears of corn forming the letter "A" for King Albert I.

The Star of Cadet of Labour is an enamelled pin shaped as a five-pointed star showing an anvil and topped with a royal crown.

== Award procedure ==
Ever year, the Royal Institute of the Elites of Labour selects a number of professional sectors within which the Honour Badge of Labour will be awarded to meritorious workers, and defines sector-specific conditions to receive the award. Individuals within those sectors may submit an application to the Institute, with a file demonstrating compliance with the award criteria and two commendation letters from co-workers (including, if applicable, the candidate's supervisor). On the basis of the application, the Institute decides if the candidate deserves the award. The Badge of Honour is awarded in a public ceremony.

About five professional sectors are selected every year by the Institute, on a rotational basis, from a total of more than one hundred, such as lace makers, butchers, bakers, opticians or members of military aviation.

== Notable recipients ==
- Patrick Damiaens, ornamental and heraldic woodcarver (2015)

== See also ==
- Orders, decorations, and medals of Belgium
