= Patrick Damiaens =

Belgian woodcarver

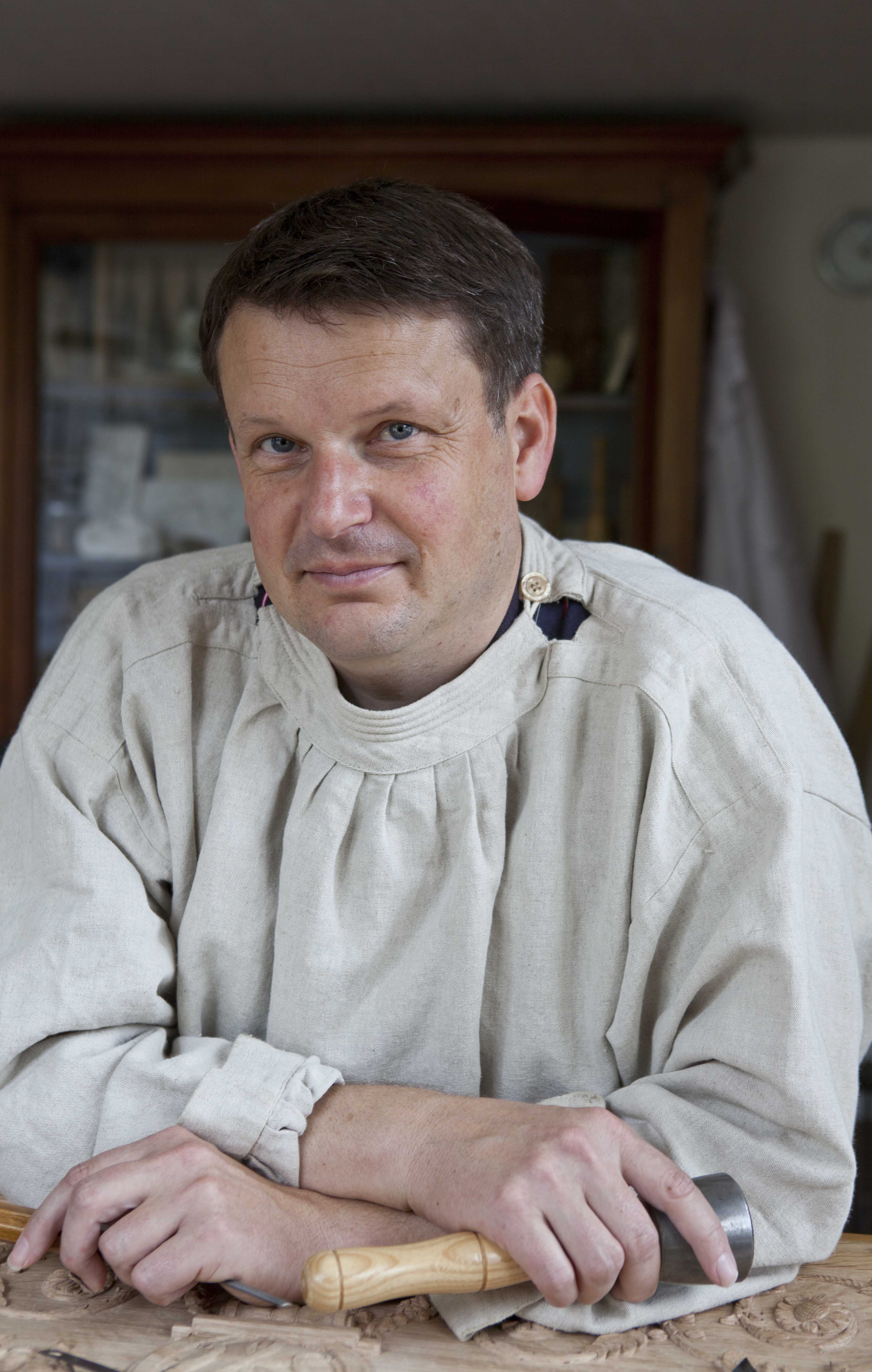
- Born: 15 November 1966 (age 59)
- Occupation: Woodcarver
- Years active: 1989-today
- Style: Baroque
- Awards: Gold Honour Badge of Labour
- Website: patrickdamiaens.nl

Patrick Damiaens (born 15 November 1966) is a Belgian woodcarver who specialises in baroque ornamental and heraldic sculptures.

== Biography ==
After studying furniture making for six years and ornamental woodcarving for four years, Damiaens started his professional career in 1989. He is a follower of the Liège-Aachen Baroque furniture style [fr; nl; de] which dates to the 17th century. His studio is located in Maaseik in the Belgian province of Limburg.

In 2015, he was commissioned to recreate intricate woodcarvings for prayer frames that had been stolen from Emperor Napoleon III's tomb in St Michael's Abbey in Farnborough.

In March 2015, he received the Belgian Gold Honour Badge of Labour by Royal Decree.

== Recovery of stolen coat of arms ==
In 2016, Damiaens discovered and helped to return the stolen carving of Sir Nicholas Throckmorton's coat of arms that was taken from his tomb in St Katharine Cree by alerting Art Recovery International of his find in a Namur antique fair.

== Case against Zara Home ==
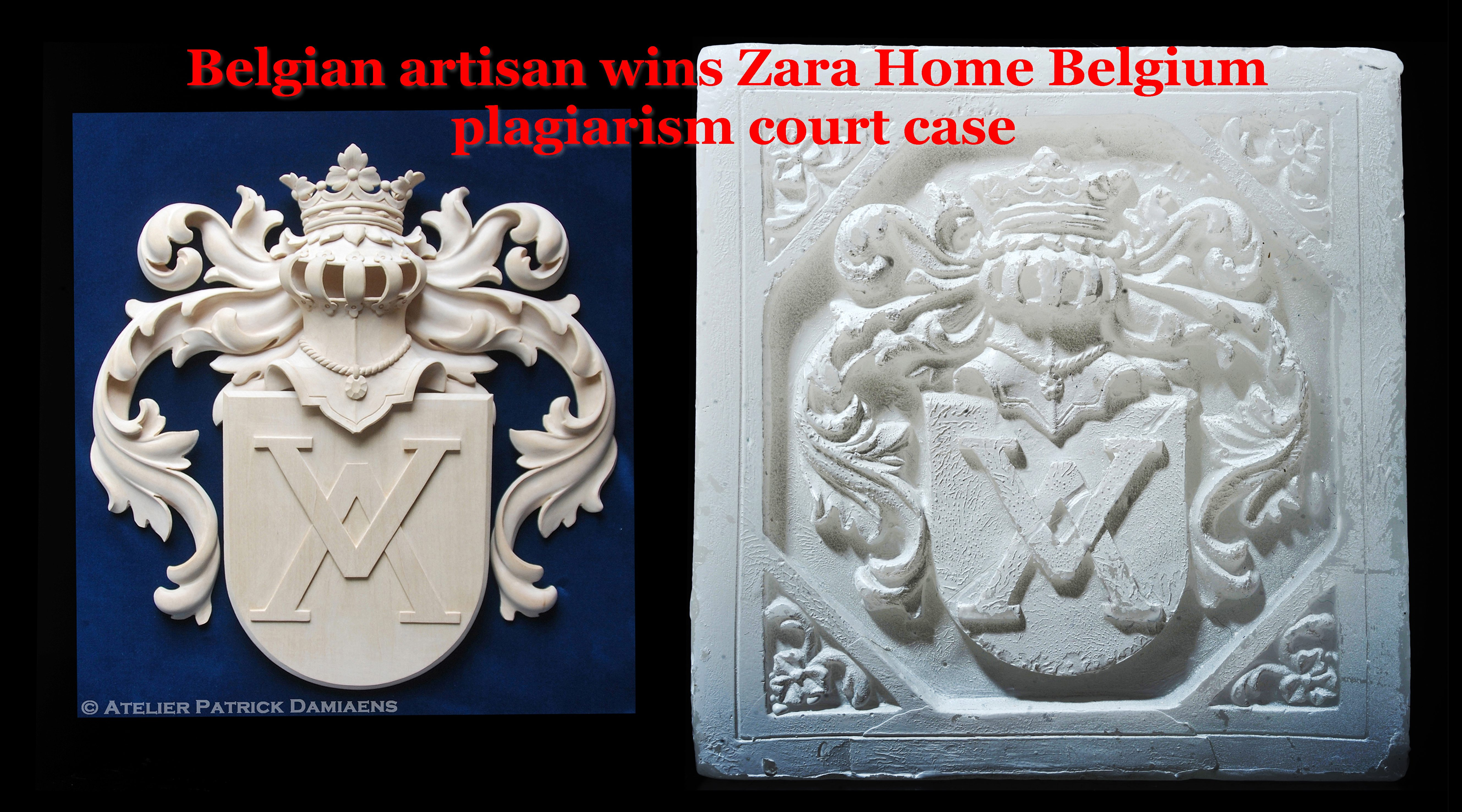
Damiaens' heraldic wood carvings versus Zara Home Belgium's plagiarized candle design

In 2017, a judge ruled that Zara Home Belgium which is part of the Spanish multinational Inditex had used one of Patrick Damiaens's heraldic wood carvings designs as inspiration for a candle they sold. They were ordered to pay damages to Damiaens for plagiarism and the candles were taken off the market.

== Distinctions and awards ==
- 2015: Gold Honour Badge of Labour

== Gallery ==
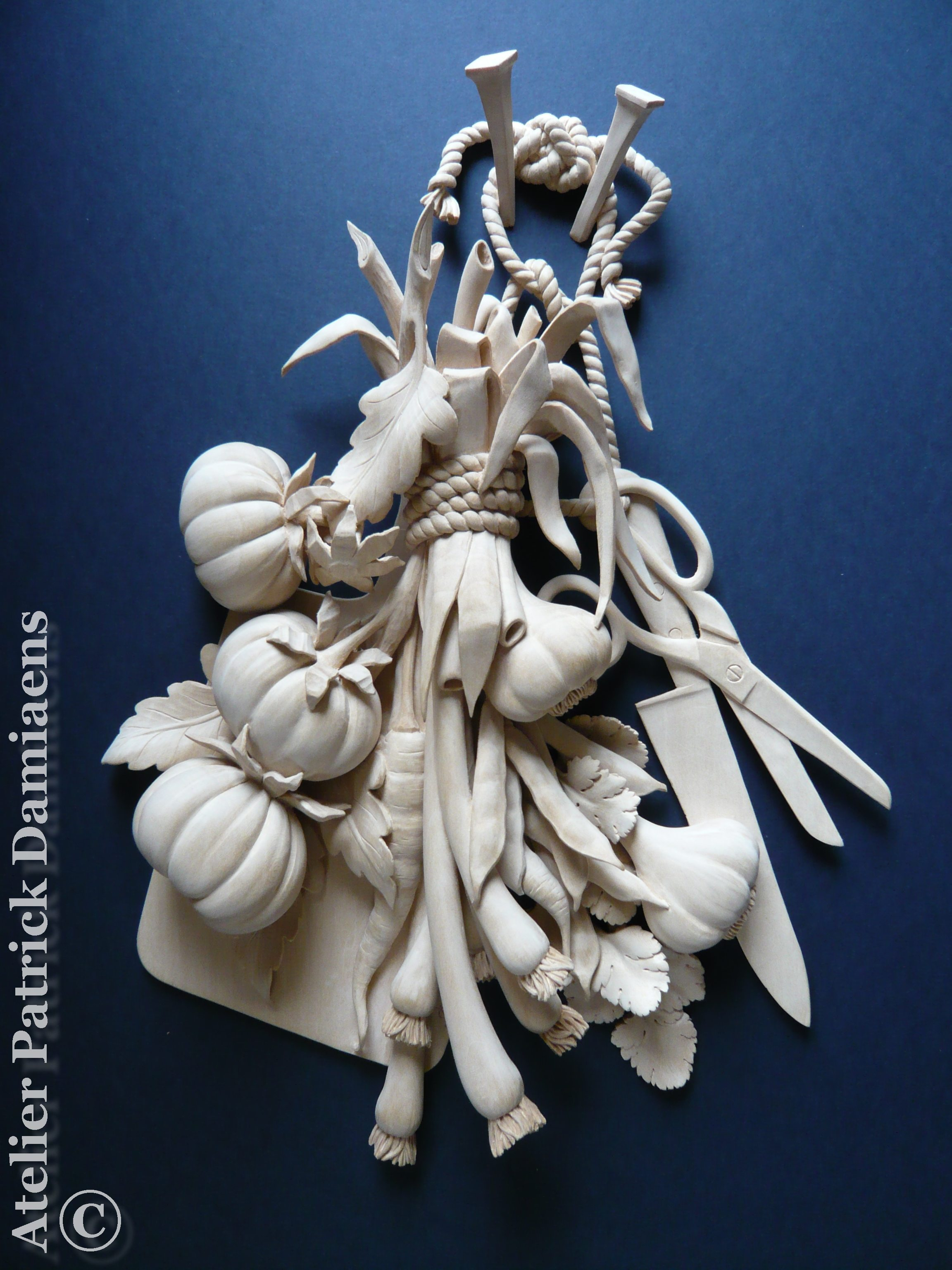
Costoluto Genovese (2011)

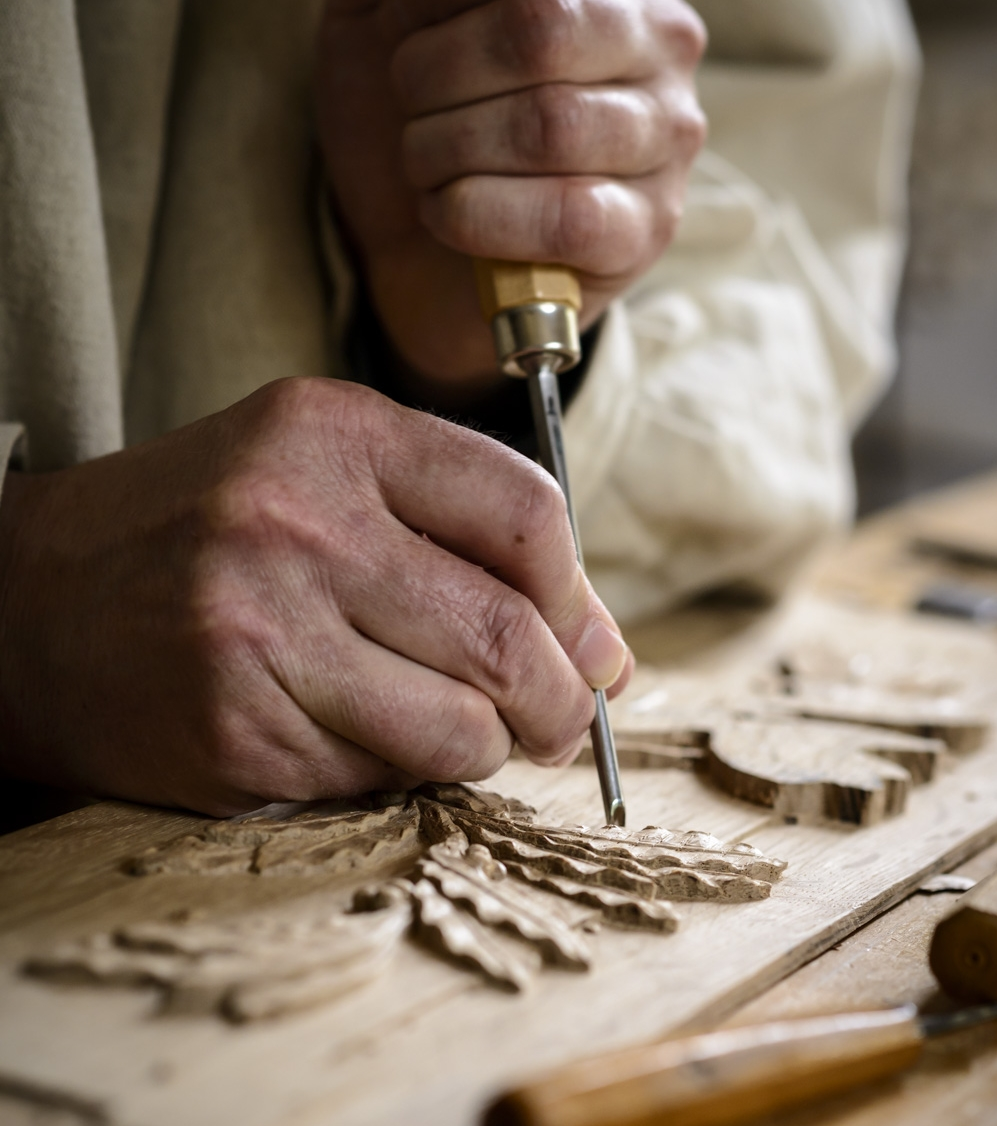
Damiaens carving ornamental wood

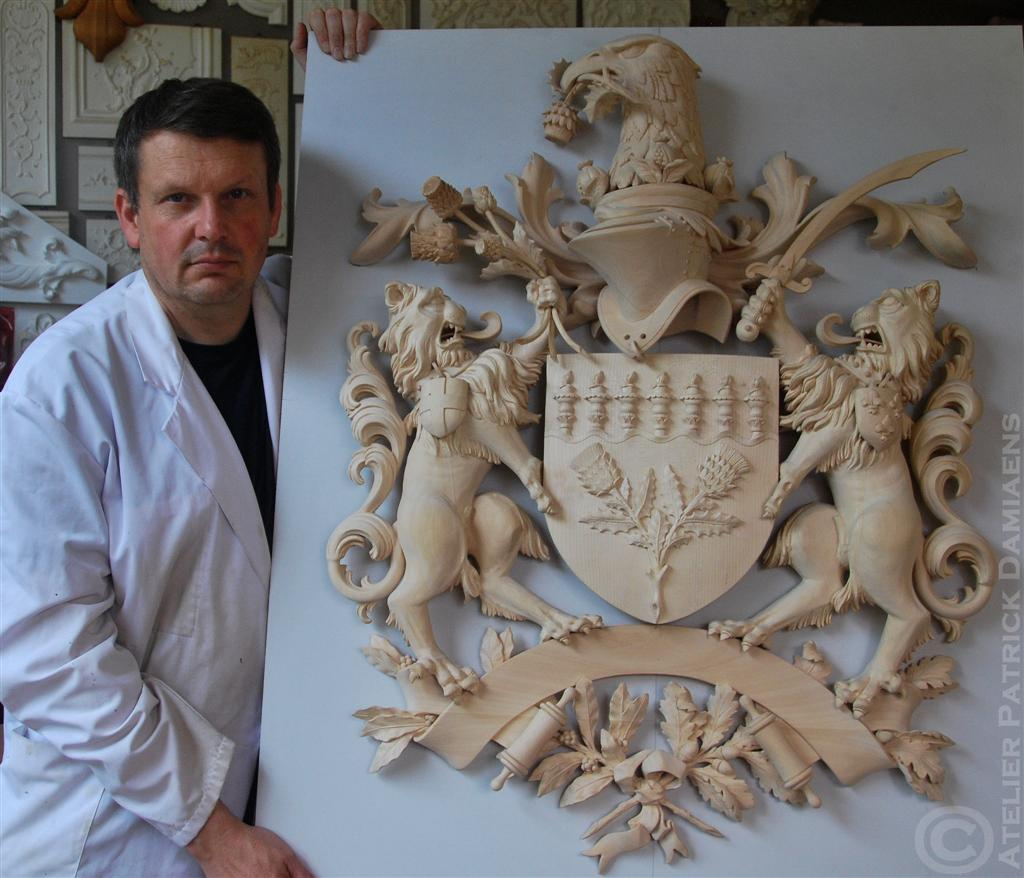
Damiaens with a carved coat of arms for the Cardone family

== See also ==
- List of woodcarvers
- Grinling Gibbons
- Peter Van Dievoet
- Jacques Verberckt [fr]
- Jean Démontreuil
- Aubert-Henri-Joseph Parent [fr; de]
