= Susteren =

Susteren Zöstere (Limburgish)
- Village
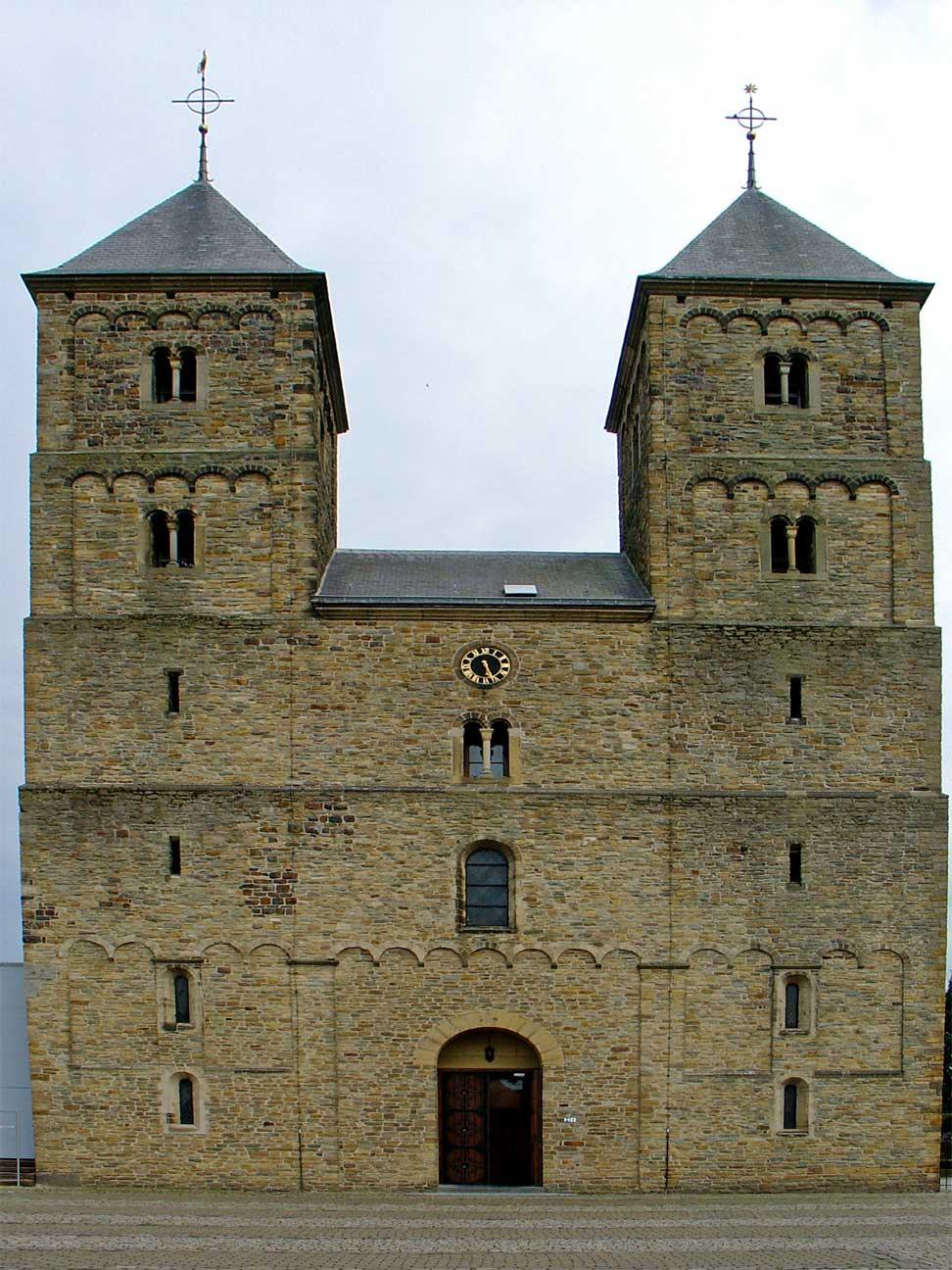
- The St Amelberga Church in Susteren

- Flag Coat of arms

- Location in the Netherlands Location in the province of Limburg in the Netherlands
- Coordinates: 51°04′N 5°52′E
- Country: Netherlands
- Province: Limburg
- Municipality: Echt-Susteren

Area
  - Total: 7.64 km^{2} (2.95 sq mi)
- Elevation: 32 m (105 ft)

Population (2021)
  - Total: 5,965
  - Density: 781/km^{2} (2,020/sq mi)
- Time zone: UTC+1 (CET)
  - Summer (DST): UTC+2 (CEST)
- Postal code: 6114
- Dialing code: 046

Susteren (Dutch: [ˈsʏstərə(n)]; Limburgish: Zöstere [ˈzœstəʀə]) is a city in the Dutch province of Limburg. It is located in the municipality of Echt-Susteren, about 7 km northwest of Sittard. It was a separate municipality until 2003, when it was merged with Echt. Susteren received city right in 1276.

Susteren harboured the Benedictine Abbey Susteren, that was founded in the 8th century and was closed at the end of the 18th century. Its Romanesque church was raised to the status of a basilica in 2007 by pope Benedict XVI. There is a museum ‘t Stift next to the church. Other sights are the Cannon on the market, castle Eyckholt, the mill Dieterdermolen and typical River Meuse valley farms like the Hommelhof.

In 1865, Susteren railway station opened on the Maastricht–Venlo railway line.

== Gallery ==
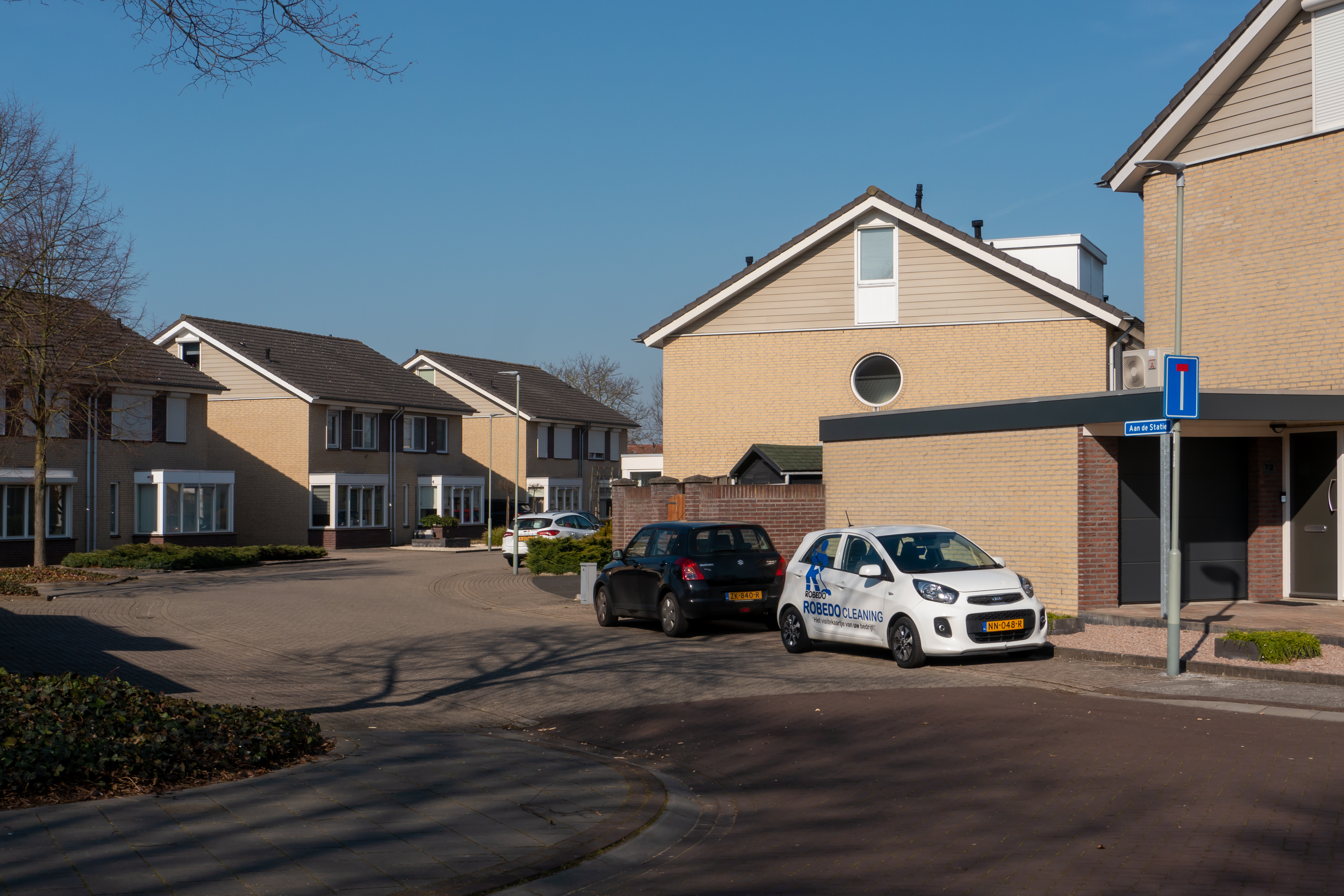
Residential neighbourhood

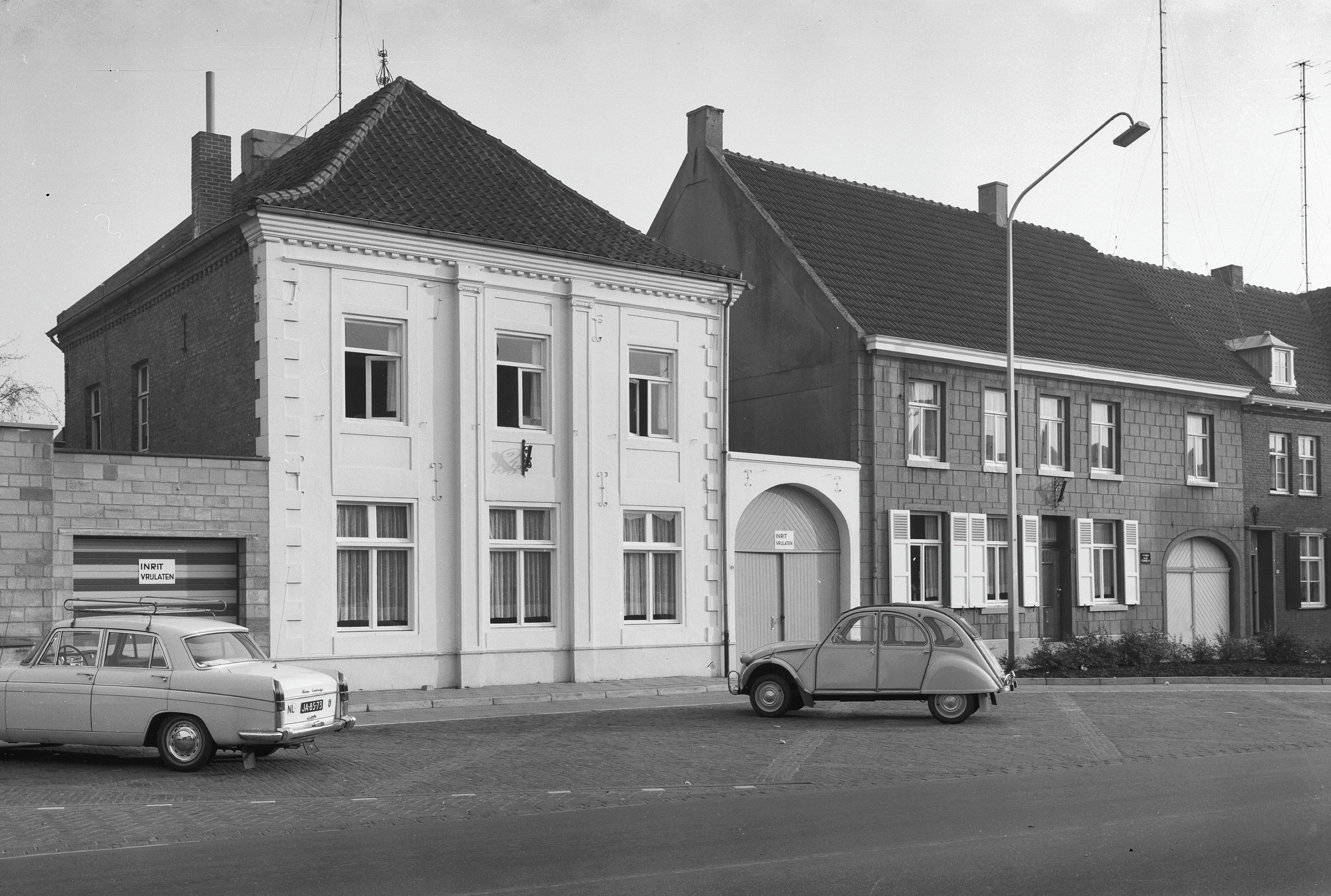
Houses on the market square (1965)

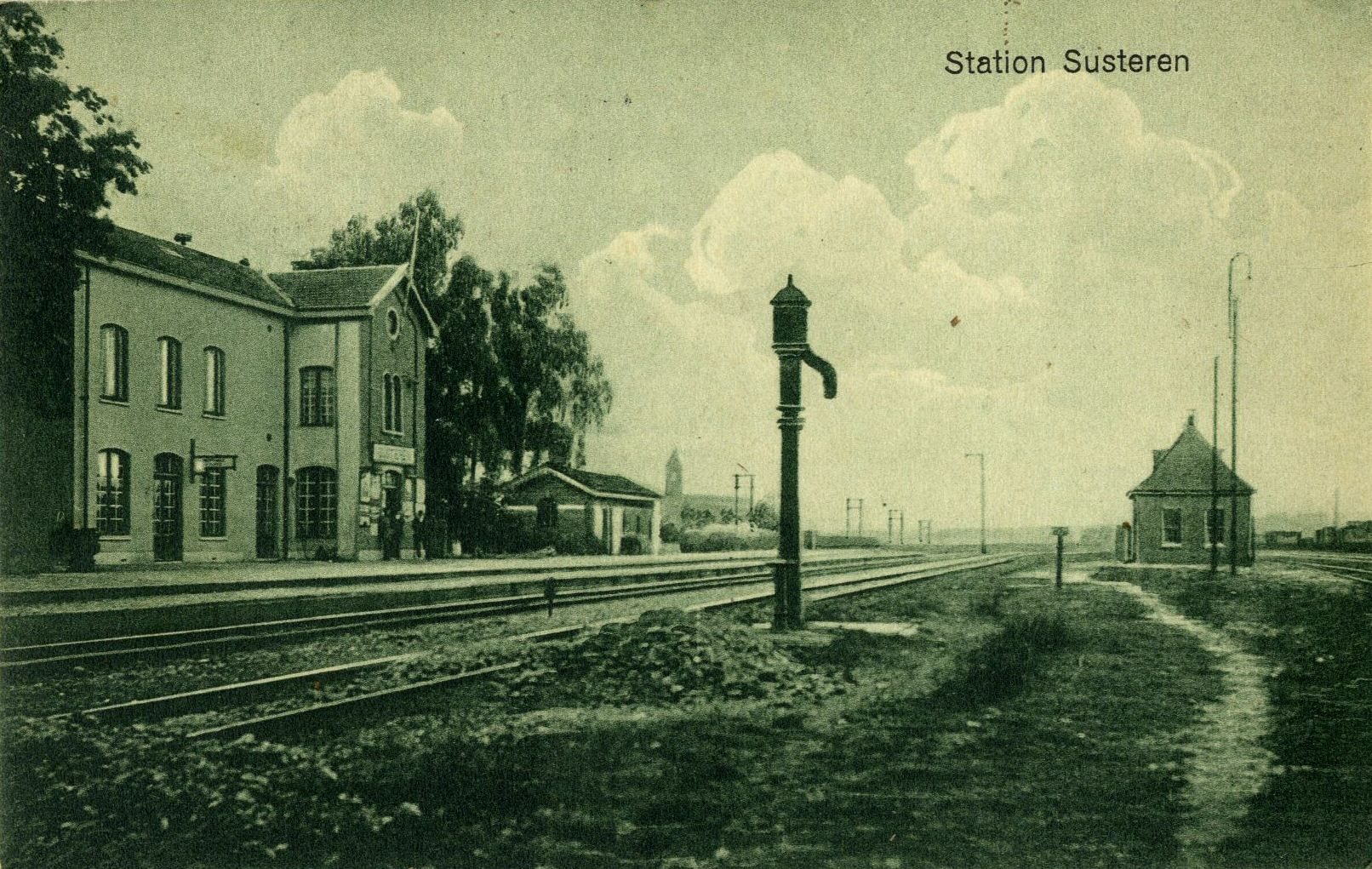
Postcard of the old railway station (1919-1924_

== See also ==
- Van Susteren, a surname literally meaning "from Susteren"
