= Susteren Abbey =

Former abbey in Susteren, Netherlands

Coordinates: 51°3′40″N 5°51′3″E

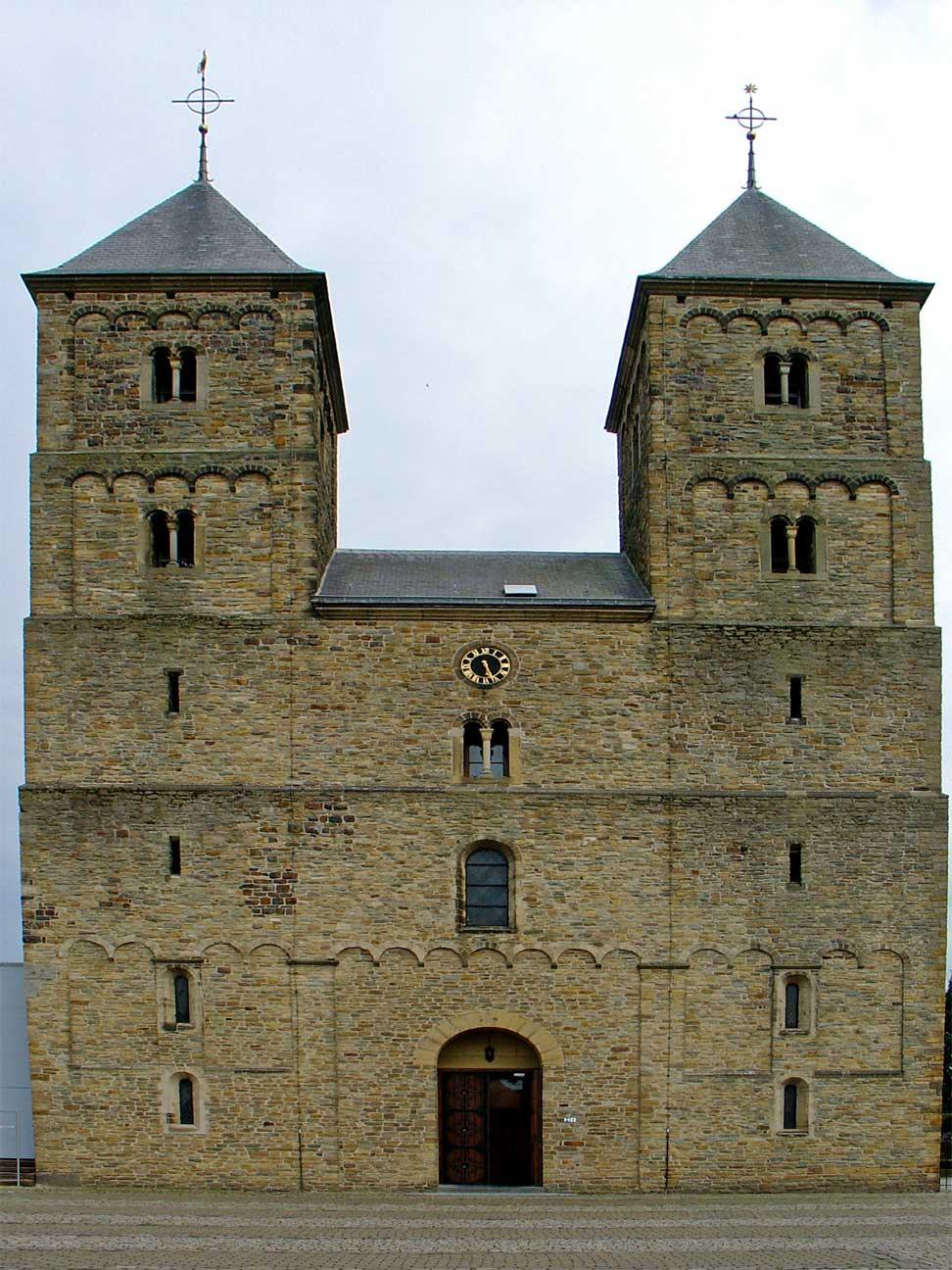
Westwork of the former church of Susteren Abbey, now St. Amelberga Basilica

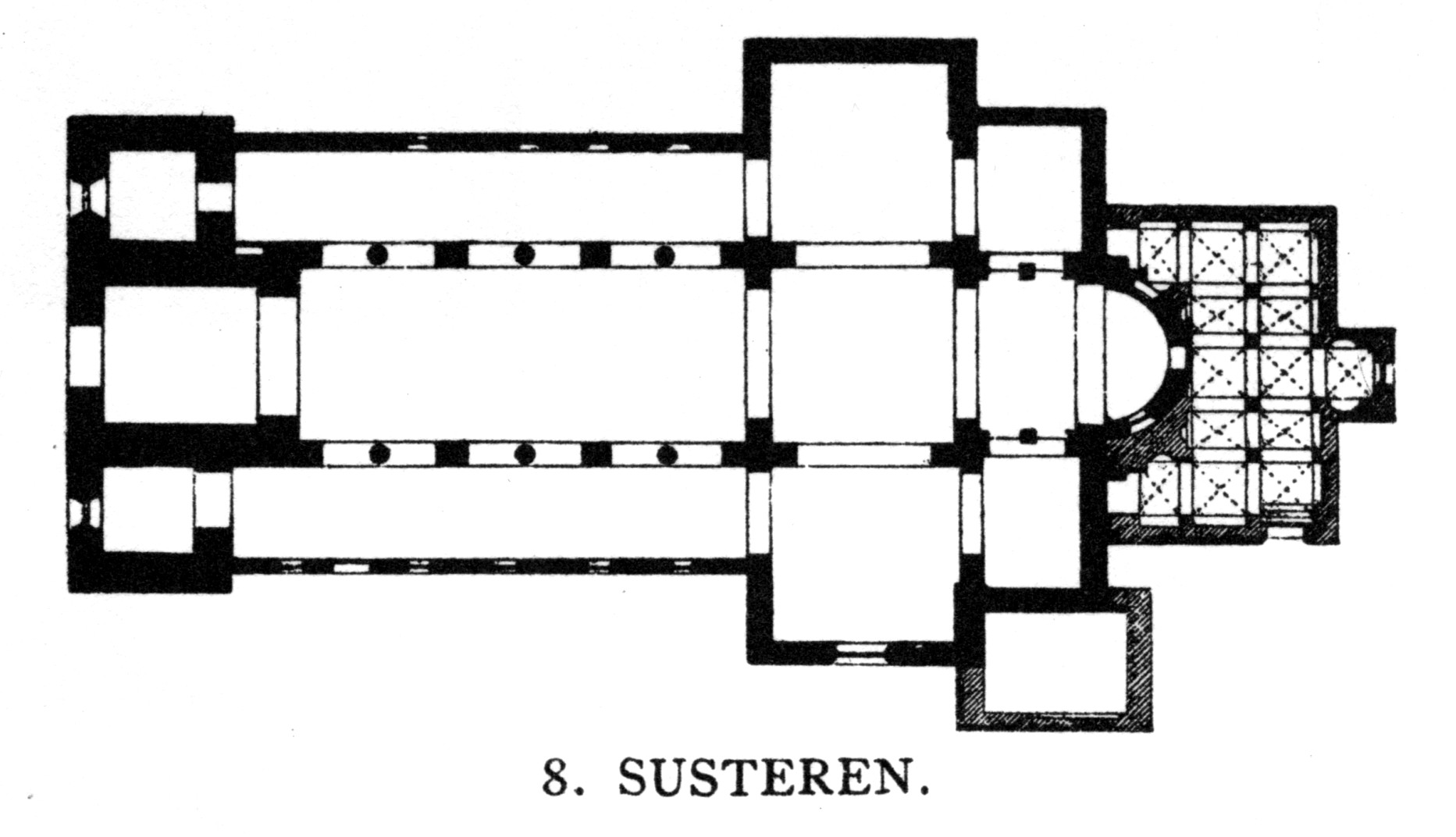
Plan of the abbey church

Susteren Abbey (Dutch: Abdij van Susteren) is a former Benedictine abbey at Susteren near Roermond, in the Dutch province of Limburg, founded in the 8th century. The former abbey church is now St. Amelberga's Basilica.

== History ==
The abbey is first recorded in 711, in a letter from one of the monks, Ansbald, to Willibrord, bishop of Utrecht.

Early in 714 Pepin of Herstal and his wife Plectrude sent Saint Willibrord letters of conveyance and protection for the monastery, permitting free election of abbots. The Benedictine foundation served as a refuge for the missionaries working in Frisia and the Netherlands.

It was destroyed by the Vikings in 882 and refounded as a house of secular canonesses, whose first abbess was Saint Amelberga of Susteren, who died about 900.

The Lotharingian King Zwentibold, a benefactor of the abbey and either the father or the brother of the abbesses Benedicta and Cecilia, was buried (according to a later tradition) in Susteren Abbey in about 900.

Also buried there are Saint Wastrada, who died in the mid-8th century, and Saint Gregory of Utrecht (d. about 775/777), a companion of Saint Boniface in his missions to Friesia, and later abbot of the Martinsstift in Utrecht.

The abbey was suppressed at the end of the 18th century when the French Revolution spilled over into the Low Countries. The church alone remains.

== St. Amelberga Basilica ==
The abbey church, one of the major examples of Romanesque architecture in the Netherlands, although marred by a poor restoration in 1885–1890, was built in the 11th century. It was clearly influenced by the Ottonian minster church of Essen Abbey. It was dedicated to Amelberga in 1886, after authentication of the relics kept here. On 6 September 2007 the church was declared a basilica minor.

== Sources ==
- Habets, J.J., 1869: Bijdragen tot de geschiedenis van de voormalige stad Susteren en van de adellijke vrouwenabdij Sint-Salvator aldaar, Publications de la Société Historique et Archéologique dans le Limbourg 6 (1869), 441–567.
- Koldeweij, A.M., and van Vlijmen, P.M.L. (eds.), 1985: Schatkamers uit het Zuiden. Tentoonstellingscatalogus Rijksmuseum het Catharijneconvent (pp. 83–92, 97–104, 165–167). Utrecht
- Roozen, N., 1960: Uit de schatkamer van de oude abdijkerk van Susteren. Harreveld
- Sangers, W., and Simonis, A.H., 1958: De kerk van Susteren. Karolingische familieabdij. Adellijk vrouwenstift. Parochie. Susteren
