= Pilgrimage of the Relics, Maastricht =

Catholic event in the Netherlands

Pilgrimage of the Relics, Maastricht Heiligdomsvaart Maastricht
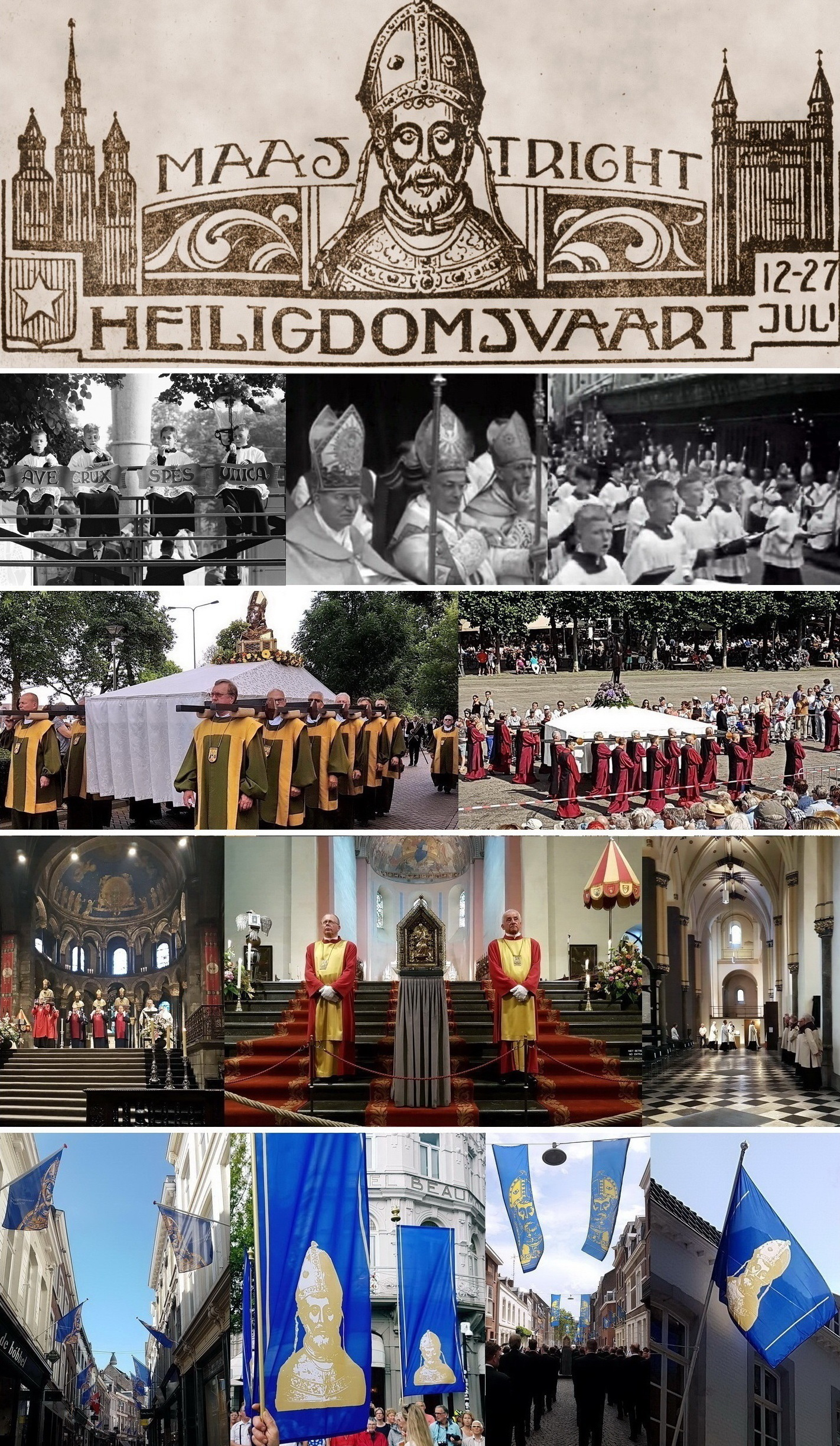
- Images of the 1930, 1955, 1976, and 2018 pilgrimages
- Status: active
- Genre: pilgrimage
- Frequency: septennial
- Location: Maastricht
- Country: Netherlands
- Years active: 635 (with a 150-year break)
- Most recent: 24 May 2018 – 2 June 2018
- Previous event: 30 June 2011 – 10 July 2011
- Next event: 2025
- Attendance: > 100,000
- Major events: masses, relics display, processions, concerts, exhibitions, etc.
- Organiser: Vereniging Het Graf van Sint Servaas
- Website: http://www.heiligdomsvaartmaastricht.nl

The Pilgrimage of the Relics or Maastricht Septennial Pilgrimage (Dutch: Heiligdomsvaart van Maastricht) is a seven-yearly Catholic event in the Dutch city of Maastricht. Originating in the Middle Ages, it developed from a pilgrimage to the grave of Saint Servatius into the present-day religious, historical, cultural and commercial enterprise. Highlights in the programme are the displaying or unveiling of the relics in the main churches and secondly, the processions with the town's main relics. The next pilgrimage will take place in 2025.

== History ==
=== Maastricht as a pilgrimage town ===
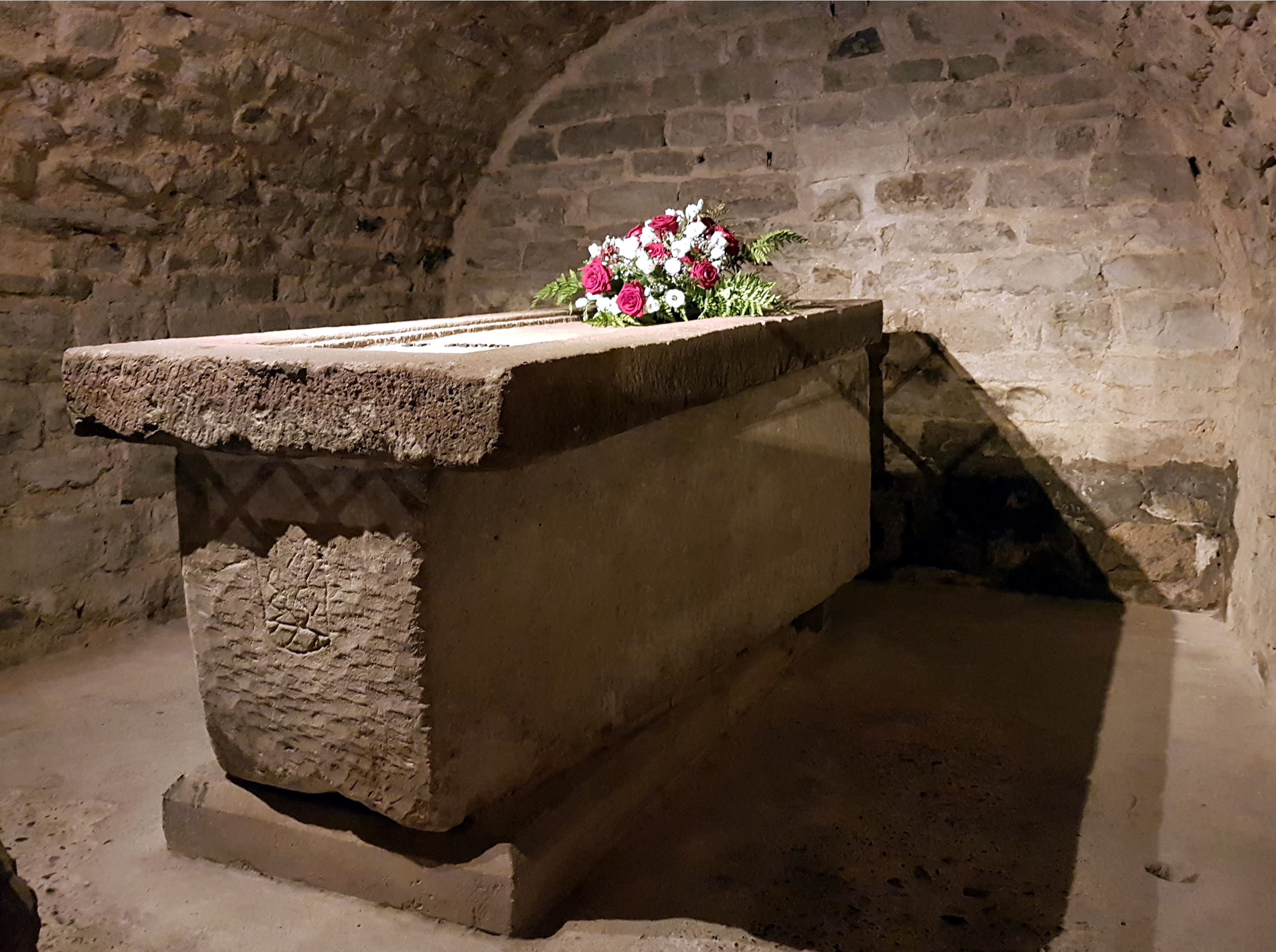
The crypt of Saint Servatius in the Basilica of St Servatius. The Frankish sarcophagus was added later

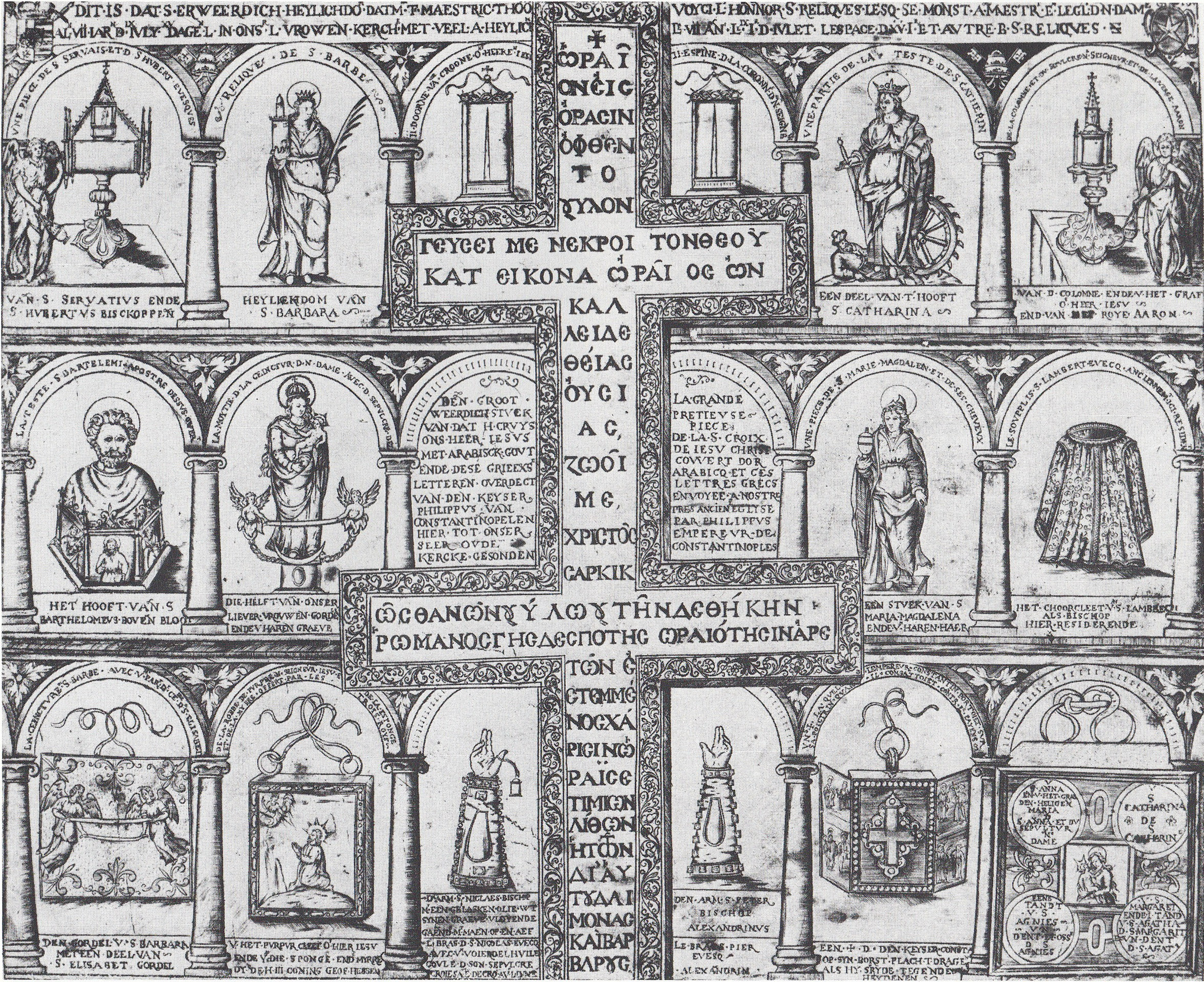
Relics form issued by Our Lady's. In the centre the Byzantine double cross

Maastricht had been an important destination for pilgrims centuries before the first recorded septennial pilgrimage. The first to mention pilgrims paying tribute at the grave of Saint Servatius was Gregory of Tours in the late 6th century. It was at that time that bishop Monulph replaced the wooden grave chapel with a stone basilica. Calendars of saints from the 8th and 9th century make mention of miracles happening at the saint's grave. As the number of pilgrims increased, the original church became too small. It was replaced by ever larger structures, until the current church was built in the 11th century. Throughout the centuries the Church of Saint Servatius acquired many relics, which were housed in precious reliquaries. The indulgences connected to these relics brought in more pilgrims. A French pilgrim calculated in 1453 that in one year in Maastricht one could earn about 800 years reduction of purgatorial punishment. At the same time, it was assumed that a completed Maastricht pilgrimage was rewarded with a plenarary indulgence (full remittance of punishment).

The other collegiate church in Maastricht, the Church of Our Lady, possessed important relics too. After the First Crusade (1096-99), two major relics of the True Cross were acquired from Constantinople. One was the so-called Pectoral Cross of Constantine, which was set in a small golden triptych. The other was the Byzantine double cross or Patriarchal cross, presented to the church by Philip of Swabia. Both reliquaries were donated to the pope by a former canon in 1837. They are now in the Treasury of St. Peter's Basilica in Vatican City. Another reason for pilgrims to visit Our Lady's was the relic of the girdle of the Virgin Mary, which remains in the church today. (Note: The nowadays much venerated 15th-century statue of Our Lady, Star of the Sea only arrived in this church in 1837, and thus prior to that date had no role in attracting pilgrims to Our Lady's. Koldeweij (1990), p. 98.)

There was great rivalry between the two principal churches when it came to attracting pilgrims. More pilgrims meant more income. The Chapter of St Servatius, considering itself the oldest and more powerful institution, made sure that no relics were shown in the open air at Our Lady's. It has been suggested that the ambulatory gallery in the choir of Our Lady's was used for this purpose. Whichever way they showed their relics, it was almost certainly less effective than the spectacular open-air displays at St Servatius'. Over the centuries several disputes arose from this, some were fought at the highest level at the Papal Tribunal. The differences culminated in 1495, when the Chapter of Saint Servatius commissioned a copy of the Patriarchal Cross of Our Lady's.

For the benefit of the pilgrims two hospitiums were built on the south-west corner of Vrijthof. The Hospitium of Saint Servatius is first mentioned in the 11th century. Next to it stood the Hospitium of Saint James, which was specifically built for pilgrims on their way to Santiago de Compostela. Due to dwindling numbers of pilgrims, both institutions took on other tasks in the 17th century. They were demolished in the early 19th century.

=== Middle Ages: Apogee of the Maastricht pilgrimage ===
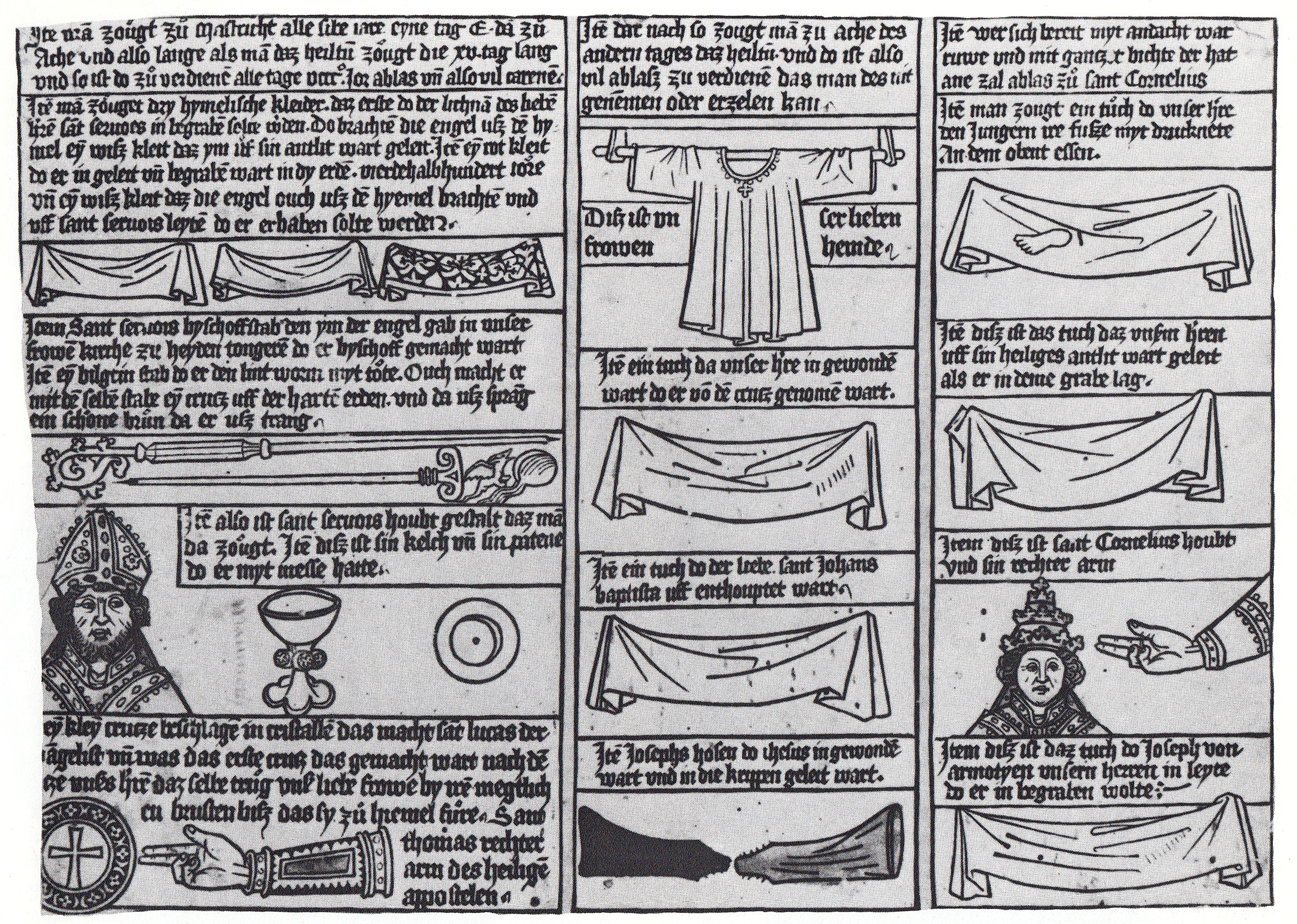
Relics form of the 1468 pilgrimages of Maastricht, Aachen and Kornelimünster Abbey

The Dutch word heiligdomsvaart (German: Heiligtumsfahrt) means "journey to the holy relics". It is probably derived from the older German terms Römerfahrt and Aachener Fahrt, the medieval journeys or pilgrimages to Rome and Aachen. The Maastricht heiligdomsvaart was long held simultaneously with Aachen and Kornelimünster Abbey. Together they offered some of the best relics to be seen in Europe. A papal bull of 1249 is the oldest document referring to the Maastricht pilgrimage around the traditional dates in mid-July, although the name heyldomsvaert is not mentioned until 1440. The term used in 1391 was heiligdomskermis ("fair of the holy relics"). The popularity of the Maastricht-Aachen-Kornelimünster pilgrimage reached its zenith in the 15th century when up to 140,000 pilgrims visited these towns in mid-July.

The septennial pilgrimage in medieval Maastricht was centred around the Church of Saint Servatius, although Our Lady's and other churches undoubtedly benefitted with their indoors activities. The traditional date was one week before and one week after 16 July, the feast of the holy bishops Monulph and Gondulph. (Note: In Aachen the pilgrimage centred around 17 July, the dedication of Aachen Cathedral. It remains unclear whether this was a coincidence or planned. It was certainly hugely beneficial to both. Later Kornelimünster joined in.) It is not known when this date became the focal point of the Maastricht pilgrimage but in 1289 auxiliary bishop Bonaventura of Liège offered an indulgence to pilgrims visiting the grave of Saint Servatius around this time of the year. The year in which a septennial pilgrimage took place was a Jubilee, which meant that extra indulgences were granted. The majority of pilgrims aimed to earn indulgences by visiting the grave of Saint Servatius, drinking holy water from the cup of Saint Servatius and attending at least one of the daily relics displays. No indulgences could be obtained without going to confession and doing penance. After fulfilling the requirements pilgrims received a pre-printed confessional certificate. A chaplain would fill in the name of the pilgrim and attach the seal of the church.

In Maastricht the Collegiate Church of Saint Servatius had the sole right of showing relics in the open air. During the septennial pilgrimage this took place once a day at Vrijthof Square. In the 15th-century so many pilgrims gathered there, that the walls around the square had to be taken down. After celebrating an open-air mass, a selection of the church's relics were shown from the dwarf gallery, the arcaded gallery just below the apse's roof. The dwarf gallery was decorated for the occasion with cloths printed with angels and Saint Servatius' keys.

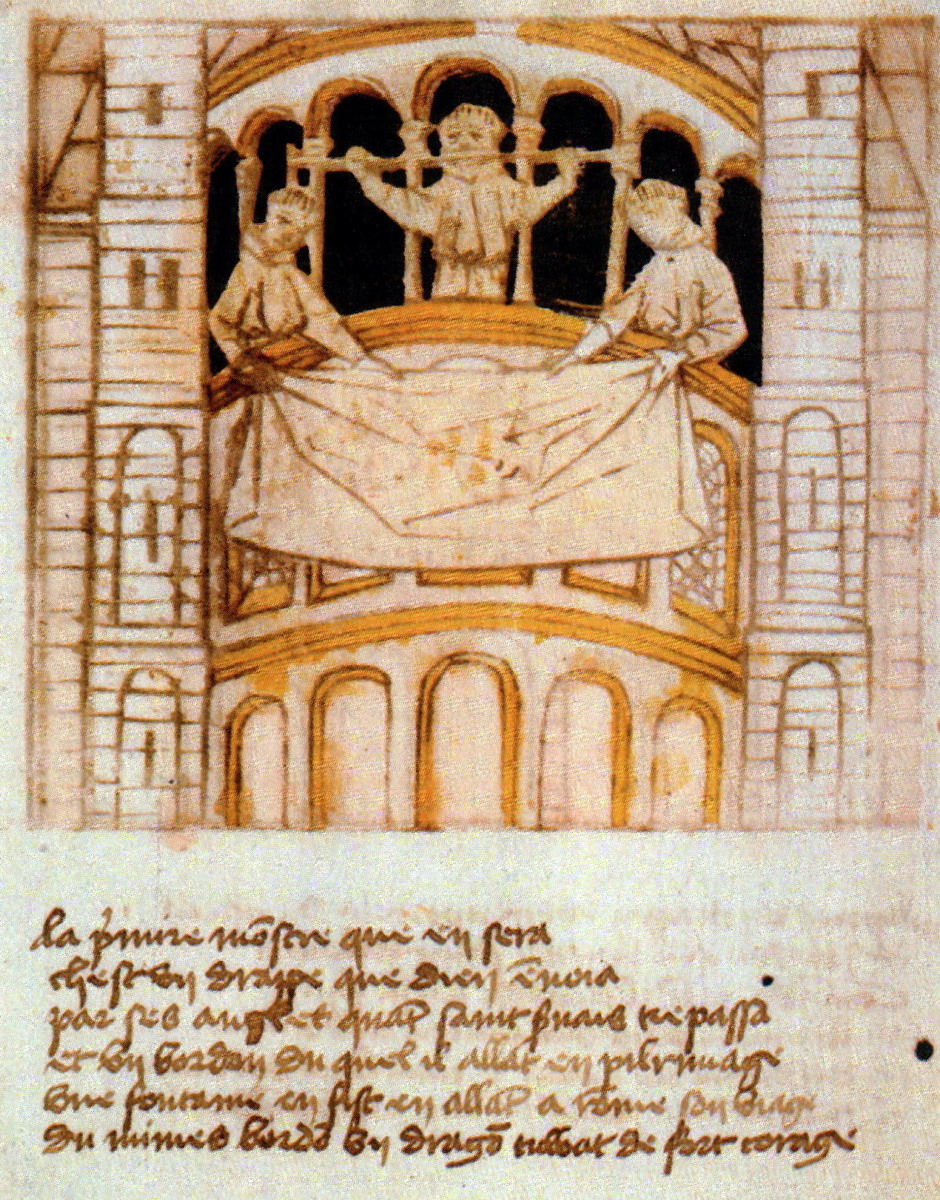
The pilgrim's staff and one of the 'heavenly cloths' being shown from the dwarf gallery (Blokboek van Sint-Servaas, ca. 1460)

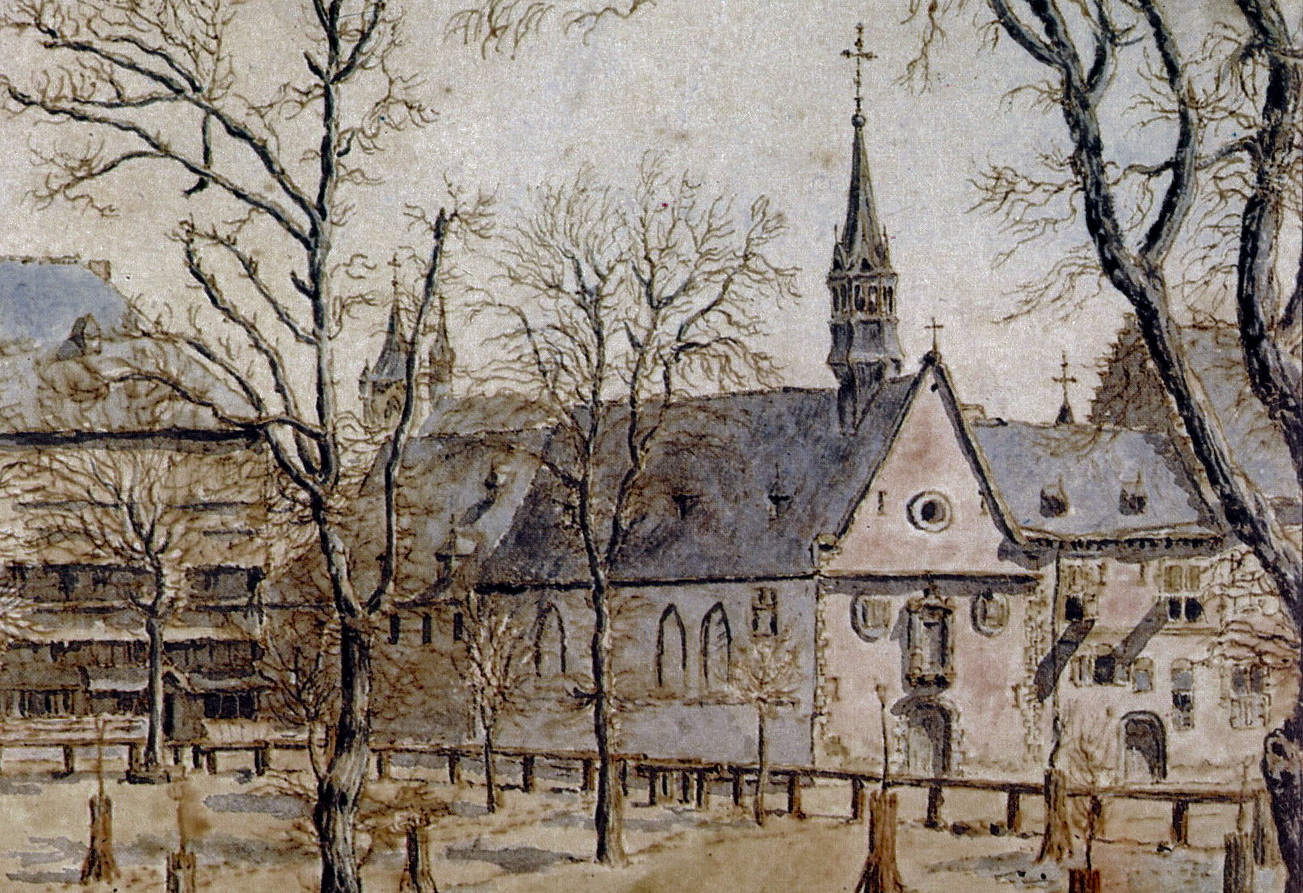
Saint Servatius Hospice on Vrijthof Square (Valentijn Klotz?, 1671)

The showing of the relics must have been a theatrical event during which many pilgrims were overcome with emotion. Throughout the ceremony loud cries could be heard. Some pilgrims were sitting on rooftops around Vrijthof to get a better view of the relics and to benefit from their exposure. Many took bread, meat and personal objects with them in order to be blessed by the relics. The relics were shown in four groups. Each group was announced with a formula that started with: "Thou shall be shown...", followed by a brief description of the objects and a prayer. The fixed order was: 1. the sudarium of Saint Servatius (one of the three "heavenly cloths", lost during the Siege of Maastricht of 1579) along with his crozier; 2. the red shroud of Saint Servatius along with his pilgrim's staff; 3. the white cloth that covered the sarcophagus of Saint Servatius, along with his chalice and paten; 4. the reliquary bust of Saint Servatius, the reliquary arm of Saint Thomas and the silver pectoral cross made by Saint Luke for the Virgin Mary. The pilgrims were then invited to visit the grave inside the church and see the other relics on display there. (Note: Many did visit the tomb of Saint Servatius, some lying on top of it and confessing their sins, as described by a pilgrim from Geraardsbergen in 1433. Koldeweij (1990), p. 94.) The ceremony was concluded by bell ringing and pilgrims blowing their pilgrim horns.

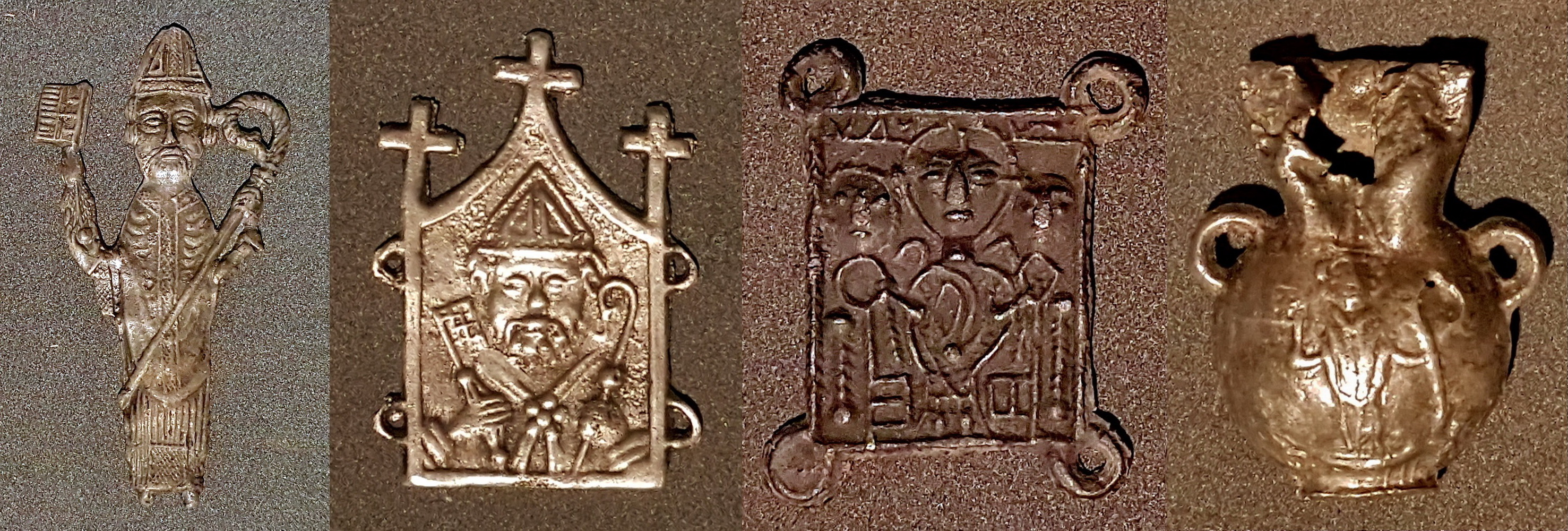
Pilgrim badges of Saint Servatius

Throughout the Middle Ages tens of thousands visited Maastricht during the septennial pilgrimage. (Note: There are no exact visitor numbers available. In Aachen 142.000 pilgrims visited in 1496. It is assumed that most of them visited Maastricht as well. De la Haye (1990), p. 113.) Monasteries, hospitals, alms houses and individual citizens offered shelter, as only a limited number could be admitted to the town's official pilgrims' hospitiums. Pilgrims came from all over Europe, notably from the Low Countries, France (Normandy and Brittany in particular, where Saint Servatius was venerated much), England, the Holy Roman Empire (Germany, Austria and Bohemia), Hungary and Scandinavia. After visiting Maastricht many carried on to Aachen and Kornelimünster, or to other pilgrimage sites. (Note: Maastricht pilgrim badges have been found in most of the afore-mentioned countries. Five badges from Maastricht as well as French and Italian sites, stuck together as a result of oxidation, were found in a grave at Selje Abbey in Norway. It may be assumed that all five were collected during a single pilgrimage. Koldeweij (1990), pp. 90-91, 100-101.) The pilgrims were vital for the town's medieval economy. During the septennial pilgrimage the usually strict rules for trading were relaxed. Every citizen could sell food and drink or change currency. Pilgrims were offered a range of religious souvenirs: pilgrim horns made of clay, pilgrim flasks made of white pipe clay and, most of all, pilgrim badges made of tin or lead. In the 16th and 17th century these were gradually replaced by printed images, pilgrim's forms, booklets, medals and flags. The objects were often decorated with images of relics from Maastricht, Aachen and Kornelimünster, which made it easy to sell them in all three places.

The fourteen days of the Maastricht pilgrimage were known as the "Freedom of Saint Servatius". It was a period when normal rules did not apply, resulting in more freedom for citizens and visitors but also in more crime. The start of this period was announced by the town watchmen blowing their buisines. From that moment on no-one could be tried for past offences. There was always a number of pilgrims who had been sent on a pilgrimage as part of a penalty. Breaking the rules during this time was punished with forced pilgrimages (e.g. to Santiago de Compostela) or fines. Magistrates and guilds formed militia that patrolled the streets, especially in areas where many pilgrims gathered. The large concentration of people in the relatively small city of around 15,000 also posed threats of fire and disease. Citizens were obliged to have a bucket of water on their doorstep to help prevent major conflagrations.

=== 16th-17th century: Decline of the Maastricht pilgrimage ===
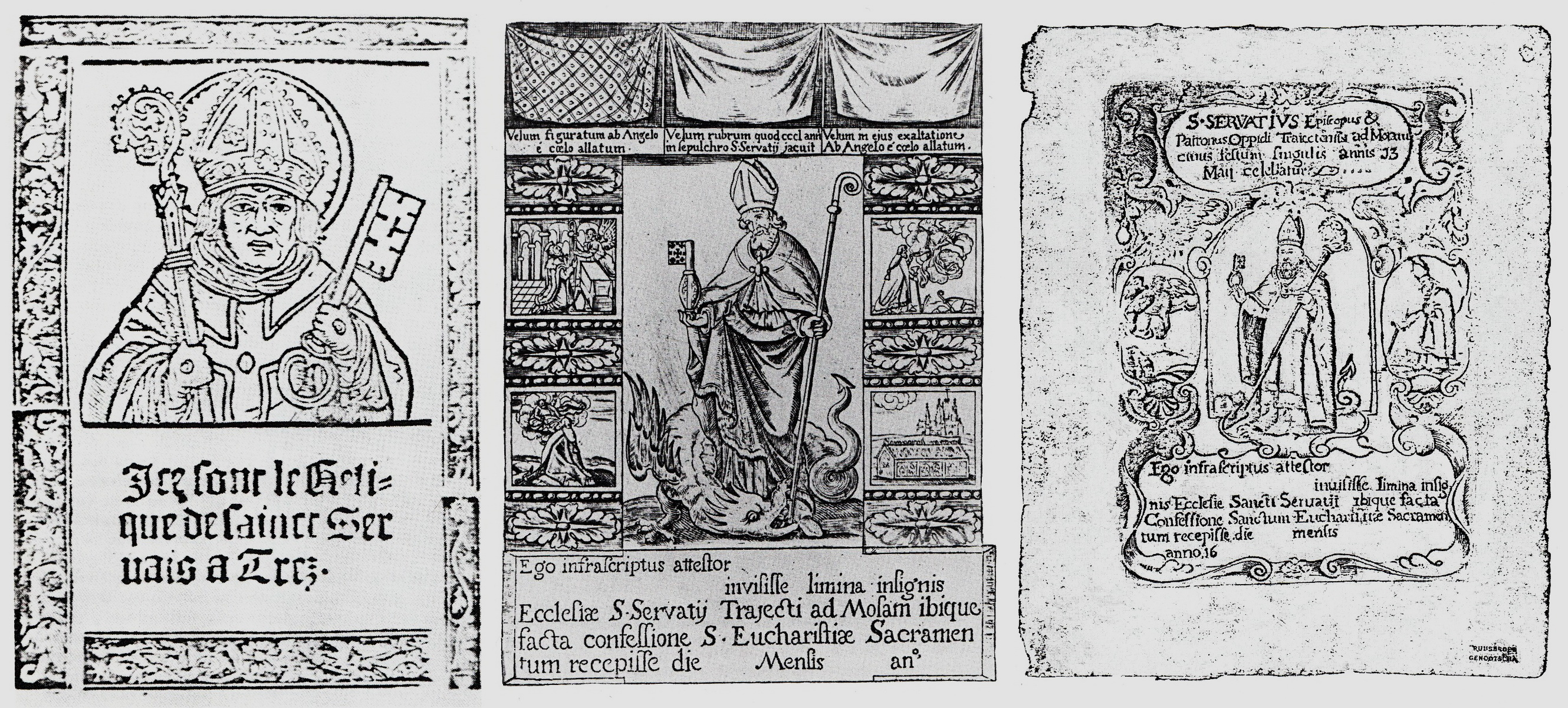
Pilgrim's booklet and confessional certificates, 16th-17th century

The decline of the Maastricht pilgrimage in the 16th century was a result of the Protestant Reformation, as well as the ensuing wars of religion and outbreaks of the plague. This affected Maastricht as much as many other places in north-western Europe. The 1489 and 1552 pilgrimages were cancelled due to threat of war. During the Siege of Maastricht (1579) the three "heavenly cloths" went missing, whereas the reliquary bust of Saint Servatius was largely destroyed. Maastricht became a heavily defended Catholic bulwark. By 1608 attendance to the pilgrimage had dropped to 13,000. After the Capture of Maastricht by the Protestant Dutch Republic in 1632, a ban on processions and other religious manifestations in public was issued, meaning the end of the traditional Heiligdomsvaart. (Note: Processions inside the church or on church grounds were permitted. The 1629 Heiligdomsvaart had been the last pilgrimage with open-air displaying of the relics. Ubachs/Evers (2005), pp. 423-424: 'processie'.) The pilgrimages of 1655 and 1662 took place inside the Church of Saint Servatius. After 1706 no septennial pilgrimages took place until the revival of the tradition in the 19th century.

During the French Annexation (1794-1814) the religious chapters in Maastricht were abolished. For some years both collegiate churches were used as military arsenals and horse stables. The church treasures suffered great losses in this period. Many objects of gold and silver were melted down in order to pay for war taxes. After the French period neglect continued. Some of the medieval reliquaries were sold to collectors or just given away. The church of Saint Servatius lost the four panels that belonged to the chest of Saint Servatius, as well as its Vera Icon by Van Eyck. Our Lady's lost its Byzantine Cross and various other objects (see above). Few regretted these losses at the time. With the disappearance of the pilgrimages and the religious institutions that had guarded these objects for centuries, they had become meaningless to most.

=== 1874: Revival of the septennial pilgrimage ===
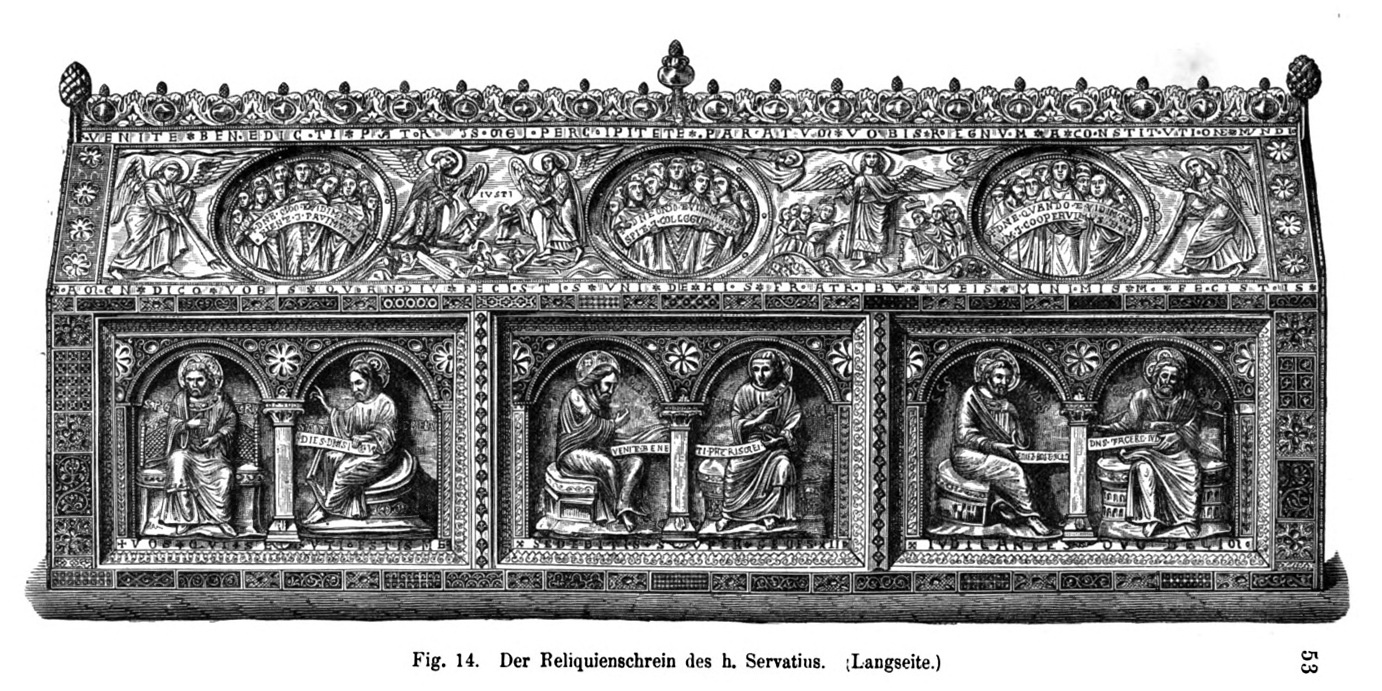
Woodcut in Bock & Willemsen's Die mittelalterlichen Kunst- und Reliquienschätze zu Maestricht (1872)

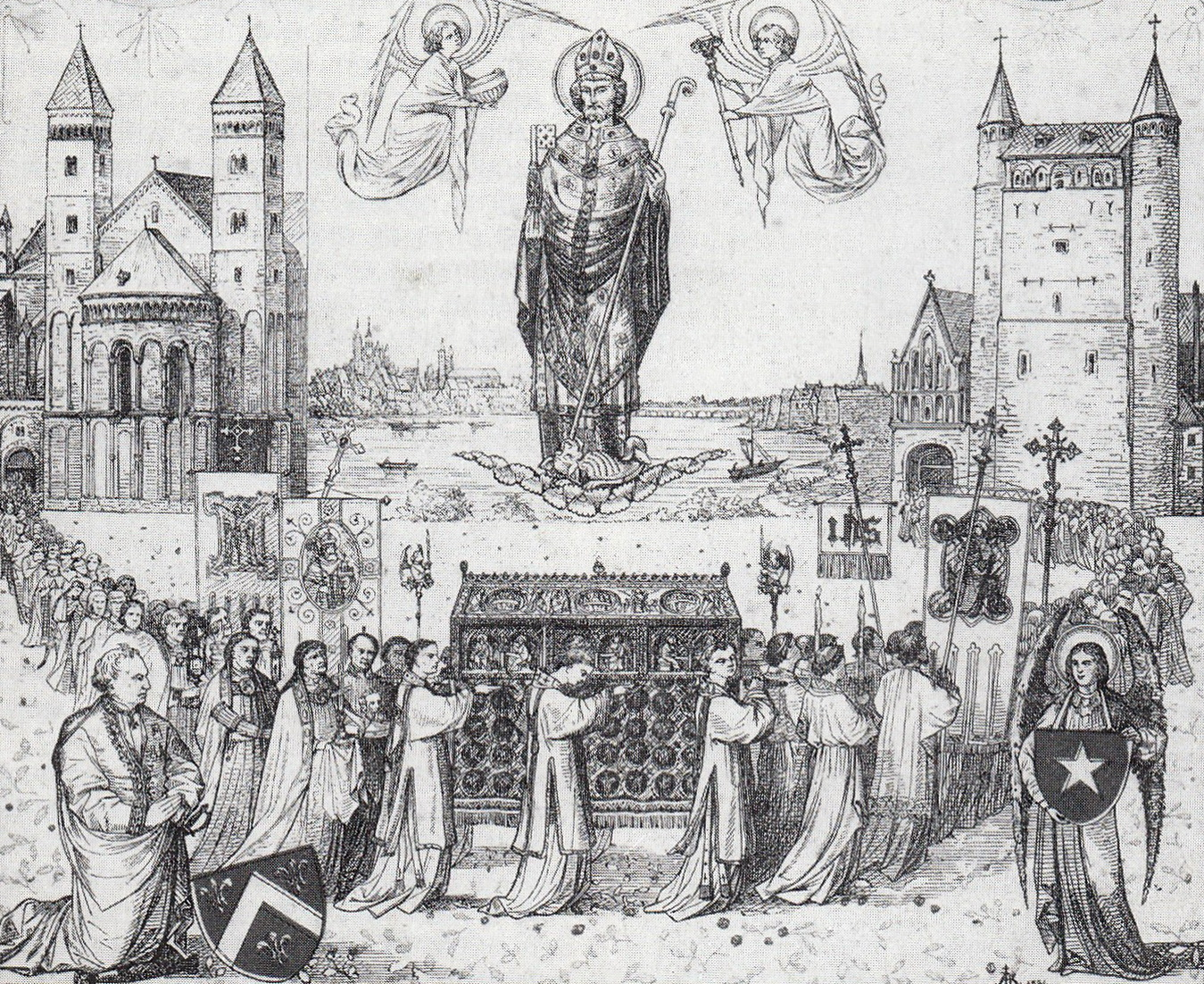
Procession with relics at the opening of the Treasury (detail of a print, 1873)

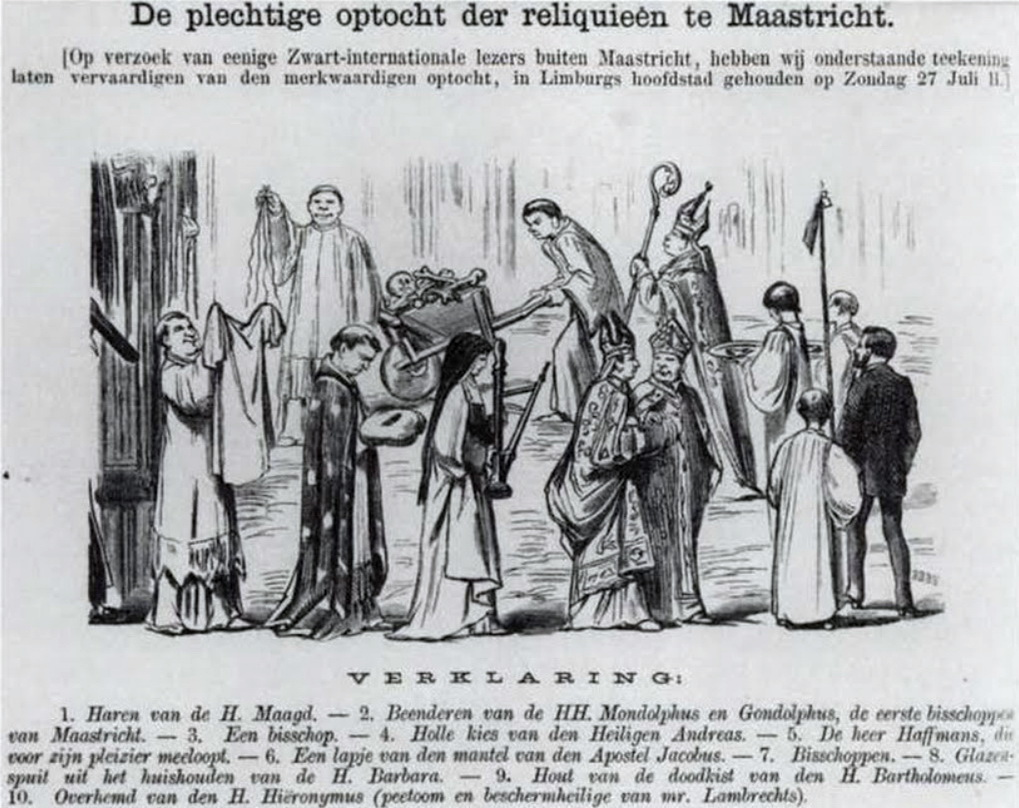
Caricature mocking the "cortège of relics" (Uilenspiegel, 16 August 1873)

From the mid-19th century Catholicism began to flourish once again in Maastricht and elsewhere in the Netherlands. Catholics' self-esteem was boosted by the reestablishment of the episcopal hierarchy in the Netherlands in 1853. Catholics now wanted to express their faith in public. In 1867 Joannes Paredis, bishop of Roermond, reinstated the feast of the holy bishops of Maastricht. Four years later he introduced the feast in honour of the relics of all saints. Many relics that had lost their containers during the French period were given new reliquaries, predominantly in the Gothic Revival style. At the same time, a renewed interest in medieval art became apparent. An important step in the reassessment of Maastricht's religious patrimony was the publication of Bock and Willemsen's illustrated catalogue of the church treasures in 1872. The French edition of 1873 moreover contained additional texts about the medieval pilgrimages, which may have contributed to the revival of the tradition one year later. Also in 1873, the Treasury of the Basilica of St Servatius, after extensive restoration works led by Dutch architect Pierre Cuypers, opened to the public. Part of the opening ceremony was a short procession with several reliquaries that went from the old treasury via Vrijthof to the new treasury. The procession with three bishops and over 50 priests was illegal as it clearly ignored the ban on processions that was included in the 1848 Dutch Constitution. Catholics in the Netherlands were impressed; others made fun of the "Maastricht cortège of relics".

The success of the 1873 procession stimulated F.X. Rutten, dean of St Servatius', to reinstate the septennial pilgrimage in 1874. Papal permission was obtained from Pope Pius IX, who also revived the medieval plenarary indulgence for those who completed the pilgrimage. The medieval custom of showing the relics from the dwarf gallery was not revived; instead the relics were exhibited in the church and during a procession. The relics remained on view for two weeks on a pedestal in the choir of St Servatius'. The route of the procession was the same as the previous year: leaving the church from the south-east portal, via Vrijthof and Keizer Karelplein to the north portal and the treasury in the cloisters. This time judicial action was taken against dean Rutten. The case went on for years; the dean persisted despite losing every single case. This and similar cases led to heated discussions in Dutch Parliament. It did not stop the Catholics taking to the streets: in 1878 six processions were held in Maastricht and in 1881 the second 'modern' pilgrimage went ahead.

=== 20th century: Towards a modern pilgrimage ===
In the course of the 20th century Catholics were no longer regarded as a threat in the Netherlands, partly due to the fact that they had evolved from being a religious minority to a majority. Whereas processions and pilgrimages were previously regarded by non-Catholics as "catholic superstition" and "folklore", there was now a certain curiosity in this sensual approach to faith. Some Catholics regarded this new 'acceptance' with scepticism.

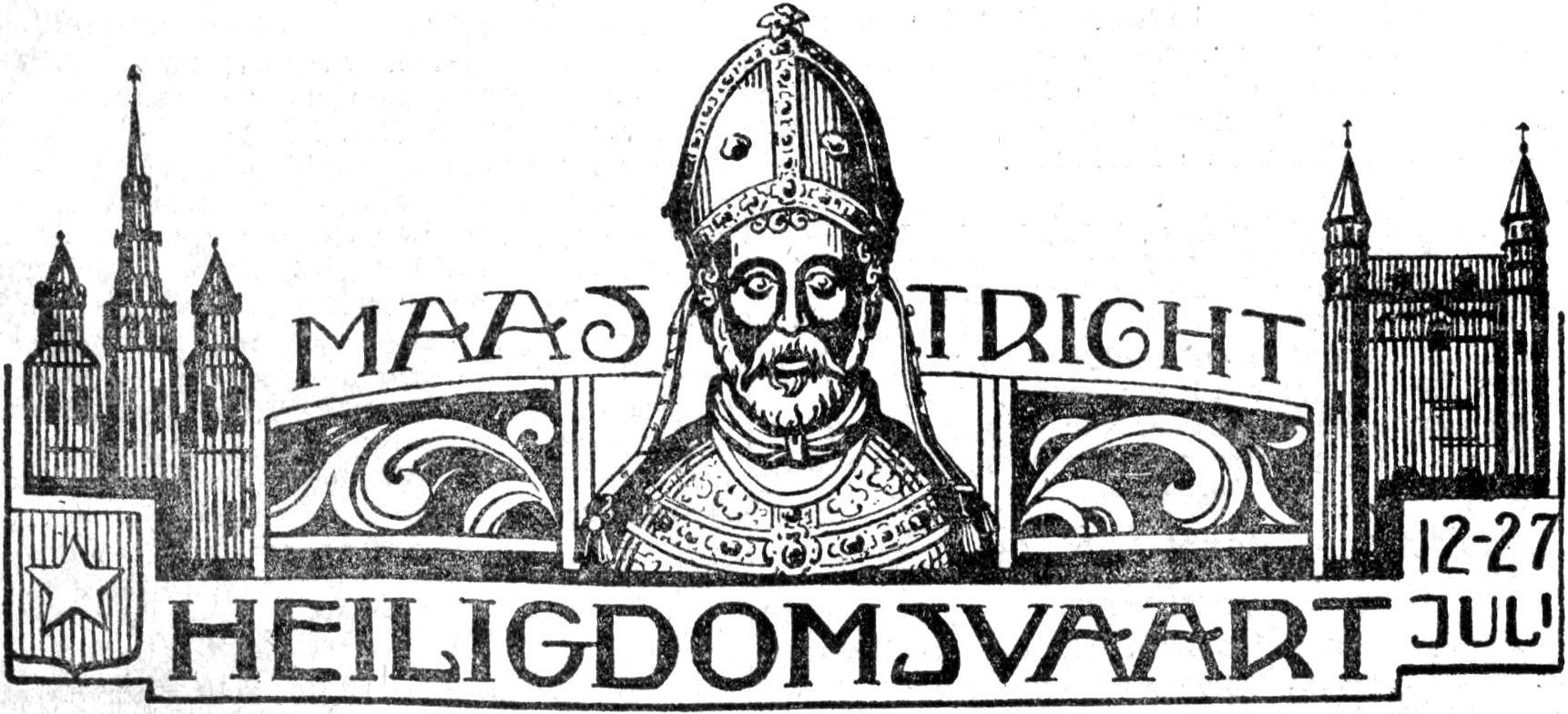
Announcement in the Limburger Koerier, 1930

During the 1909 pilgrimage displaying of relics took place in the two main churches, as well as in the parish church of Wyck, where the so-called Black Christ of Wyck could be venerated. Masses were celebrated by the archbishop of Utrecht and the bishop of Liège, indicating the high profile the pilgrimage by then had achieved within the Roman Catholic Church. In 1916 the Saint Servatius Play, a musical piece that intended to visualise the ancient legend, was performed in the open-air in Vrijthof. The play or variations on it were performed until recently. (Note: The play The Golden House performed in 1983 led to criticism by the German art historian Renate Kroos, author of an important monograph on the Shrine of Saint Servatius: "Höchst bedenklich dagegen scheint mir, daß bei diesem Aufzug (mit ca. 1200 Mitwirkenden und Kostümen von den Salzburger Festspielen) Reliquien 'mitspielen' mußten: der Thomas-Arm, die Staurothek von 1490, die Servatiusbüste und der Servatiusschrein. Einmal verbietet konservatorische Vorsicht, die gefährdeten Goldschmiedewerke von Schauspielern traktieren zu lassen." Kroos (1985), p. 406. Kroos' criticism did not have much effect; in the play Echo of a Pilgrim from 1990 relics were again being carried around. J. van Term (1990): 'Heiligdomsvaart 1990: een terugblik'. In: De Sint Servaas, pp. 422-425.) Another pre-19th-century element of the pilgrimage that was revived in the 20th century was the playful spectacle The Storming of the Castle, which took place on the river Meuse in 1930, 1937 and 1983.

Since 1937 the task of organising the septennial pilgrimage lies with the Vereniging Het Graf van Sint Servaas (Society of the Grave of Saint Servatius). The society aims to promote the city of Maastricht as a catholic centre and a pilgrimage site. Also in 1937, an old tradition was reintroduced to allow the statues of Our Lady, Star of the Sea and the Black Christ of Wyck in the procession. Several other non-reliquary objects (mainly statues of saints) have been admitted since. The 1944 pilgrimage was cancelled because of World War II. It was postponed until 1948, thus breaking the seven-yearly cycle as well as no longer being synchronized with Aachen. It also meant that participants from Aachen were able to join the Maastricht procession. In 1955 the Bust of Charlemagne came over from Aachen, accompanied by many German pilgrims (among them cardinal Josef Frings). In 1969 the reliquary chest of Saint Remaclus was brought in from Stavelot and that of Saint Gummarus from Lier; in 1976 Saint Lambert's bust visited from Liège, Saint Ursula's shrine from Cologne and other reliquaries from Oldenzaal, Visé, Aachen and Burtscheid.

Starting in 1969 the traditional dates around mid-July were abandoned because too many people were away on holiday. Initially the dates were changed to late August, early September; later to late May, early June. In 1988 a partnership with other pilgrimage sites within the Euregion Meuse-Rhine was initiated. Unlike the medieval partnership with Aachen and Kornelimünster, the pilgrimages are scheduled in such a way that there is no competition between the towns. 1990 saw a dip in numbers of visitors, possibly a result of tensions in the Diocese of Roermond under bishop Joannes Gijsen. In 1997 the theme was Where are you? with around 100,000 visitors. In 2004 the theme was We are the time. It was the first time an extensive cultural programme was added to the pilgrimage. The 2011 theme was Towards the Light. Around 175.000 attended some of the events. The 55th (modern) edition took place from 24 May until 3 June 2018. Its theme was Do good and do not look back. The next Maastricht pilgrimage takes place in 2025.

The 1955 procession (Polygoon newsreel)

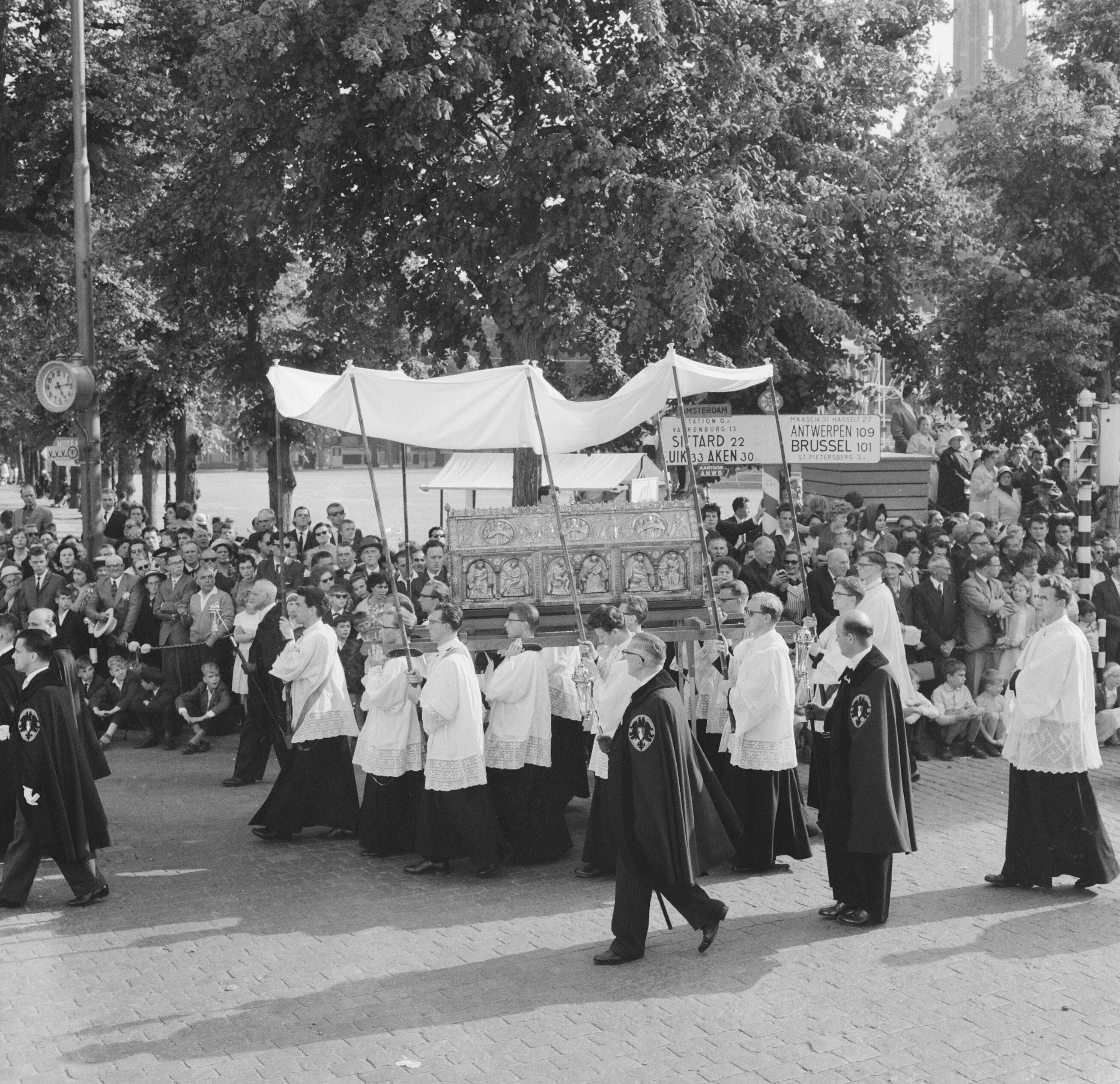
'Noodkist' (under the canopy) in the 1962 procession

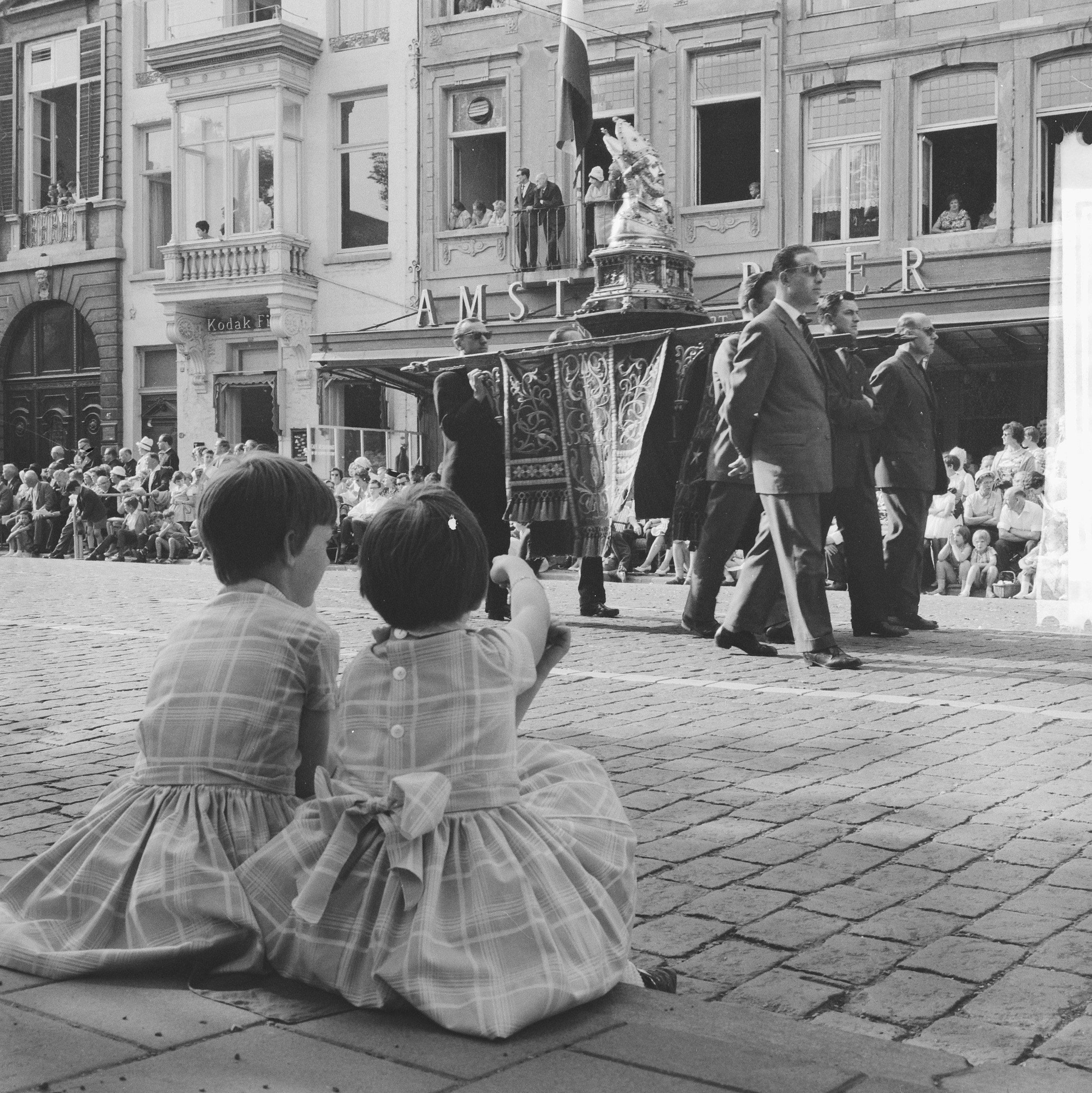
The bust of Saint Servatius in the 1962 procession

The 1976 procession (Polygoon newsreel)

== Programme modern pilgrimage ==
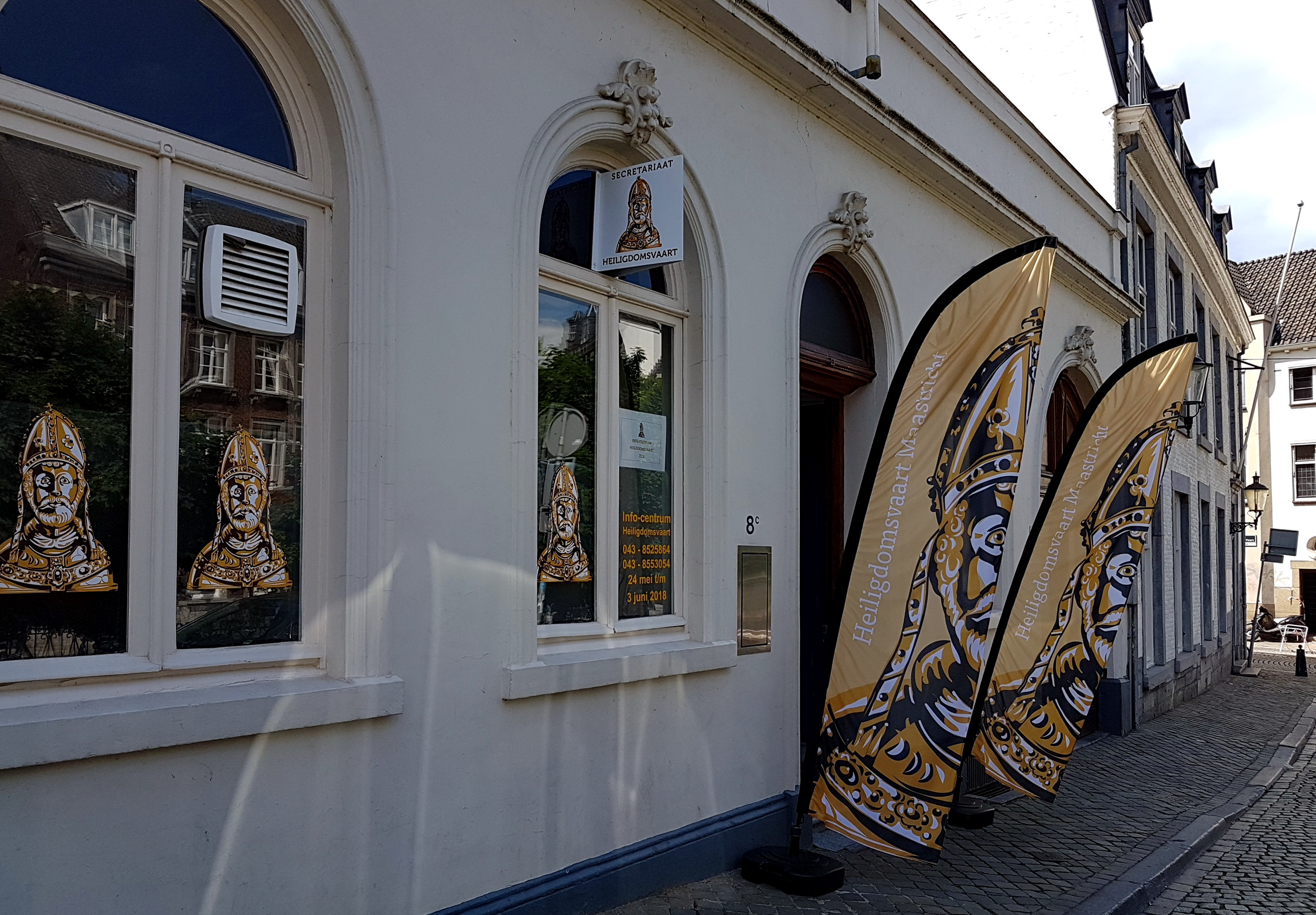
Office and information center of the Heiligdomsvaart 2018 at Sint Servaasklooster

The modern Heiligdomsvaart usually lasts 11 days. The centre of most activities is the Basilica of St Servatius. The entrance to the church and treasury is free of charge at this time (normally there is a fee). During the pilgrimage the church can be accessed via three portals, two of which are generally not in use. The small crypt, providing access to the grave of Saint Servatius, is also open at certain hours. The reliquary chest of Saint Servatius, locally known as the Noodkist ('Chest of Distress'), is permanently exhibited on the choir stairs. A secondary focal point during the pilgrimage is the Basilica of Our Lady. To a lesser degree involved are the other churches in central Maastricht, as well as a number of (Catholic) schools, senior citizens homes and cultural institutions. The administrational centre of the pilgrimage doubles as an information point for both pilgrims and tourists.

=== Masses and other services ===
The opening ceremony begins with a short service in the open air at the Spring of Saint Servatius in the Jeker valley, a few miles south of Maastricht. The service includes drinking water from the spring that, according to legend, sprung where Saint Servatius tapped his crozier on the ground. The opening ceremony continues at the Basilica of St Servatius, where the bust of Saint Servatius is carried around the church in procession, after which it makes its grand entry via the South Portal (Bergportaal), normally reserved for royal visitors. This is followed by a Pontifical High Mass, celebrated by the bishop of Roermond, the dean of Maastricht and other priests. During this mass the Noodkist is brought into the church and placed on a platform on the choir steps, where it remains for the entire period. During the next 11 days, high masses are celebrated every day, often aimed at certain groups. In 2018 masses and services were held for members of the Taizé Community, the Community of Sant'Egidio, the Community of the Crucified and Risen Love, the Society of St Gregory, the Order of the Holy Sepulchre and the monks of St. Benedictusberg Abbey. Other groups that received a special welcome in the church included pilgrims to the shrine of Saint Gerlach in Houthem, pilgrims from Sint Oedenrode and Hasselt, members of the Armenian, Philippine and Antillian communities in Maastricht, as well as children of primary schools in Maastricht. Furthermore, prayer services, Liturgies of the Hours, lectures and other spiritual activities are organised, some of which take place in the crypt, the Keizerzaal, or other unusual locations. Throughout the 11-day pilgrimage there are priests available for confession or personal counsel.

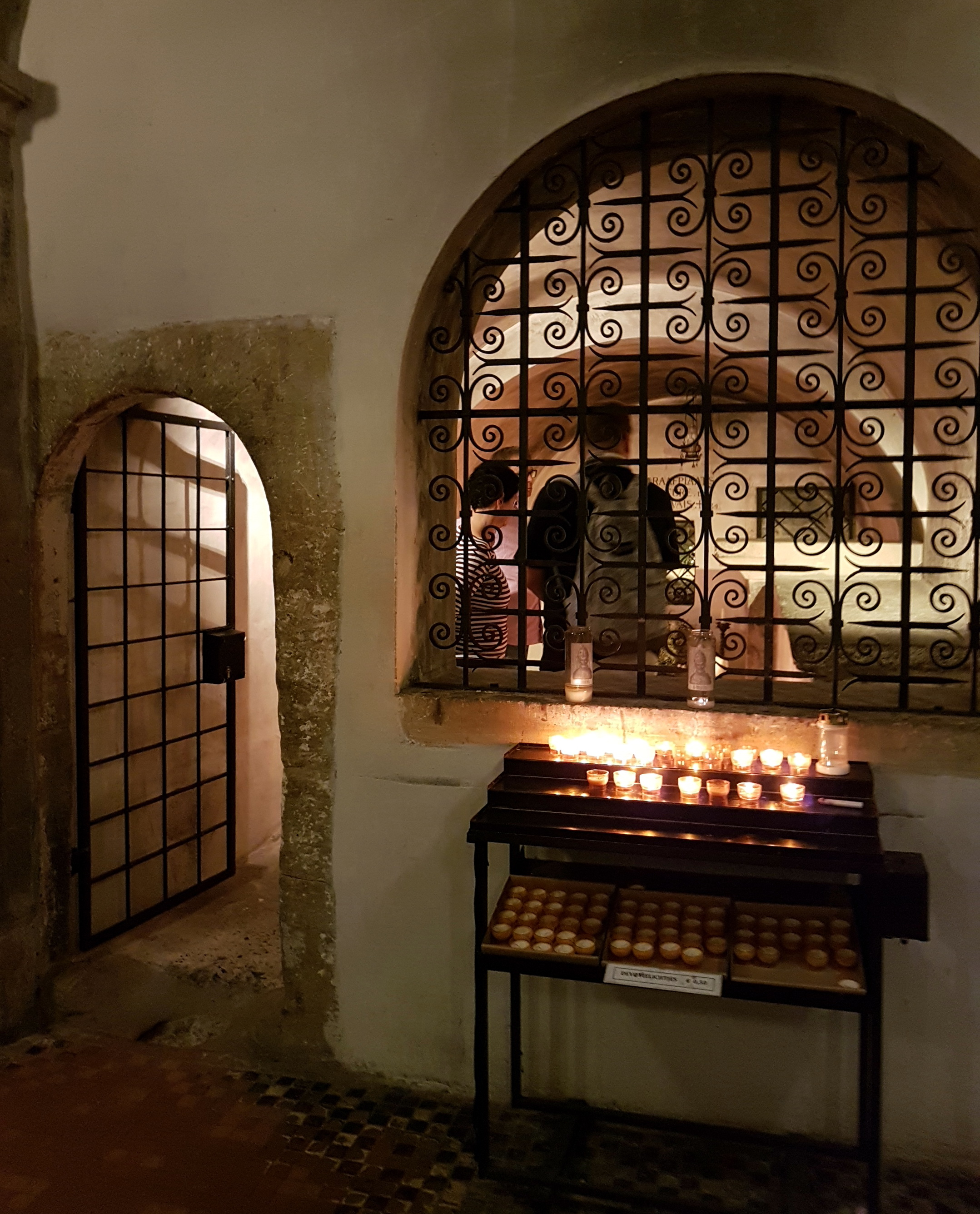
Free access to the grave of Saint Servatius

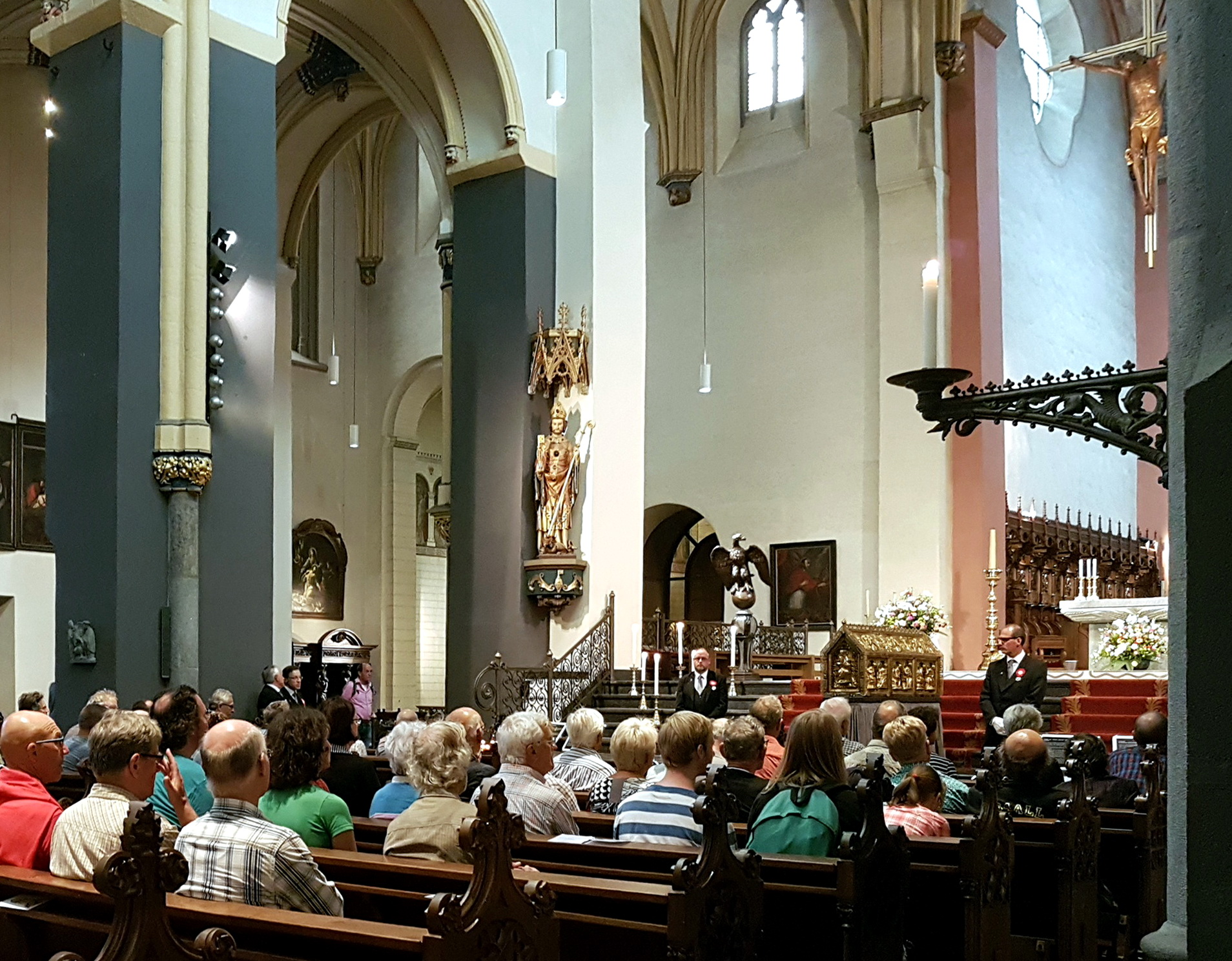
Welcome service for pilgrims from Houthem-Sint Gerlach

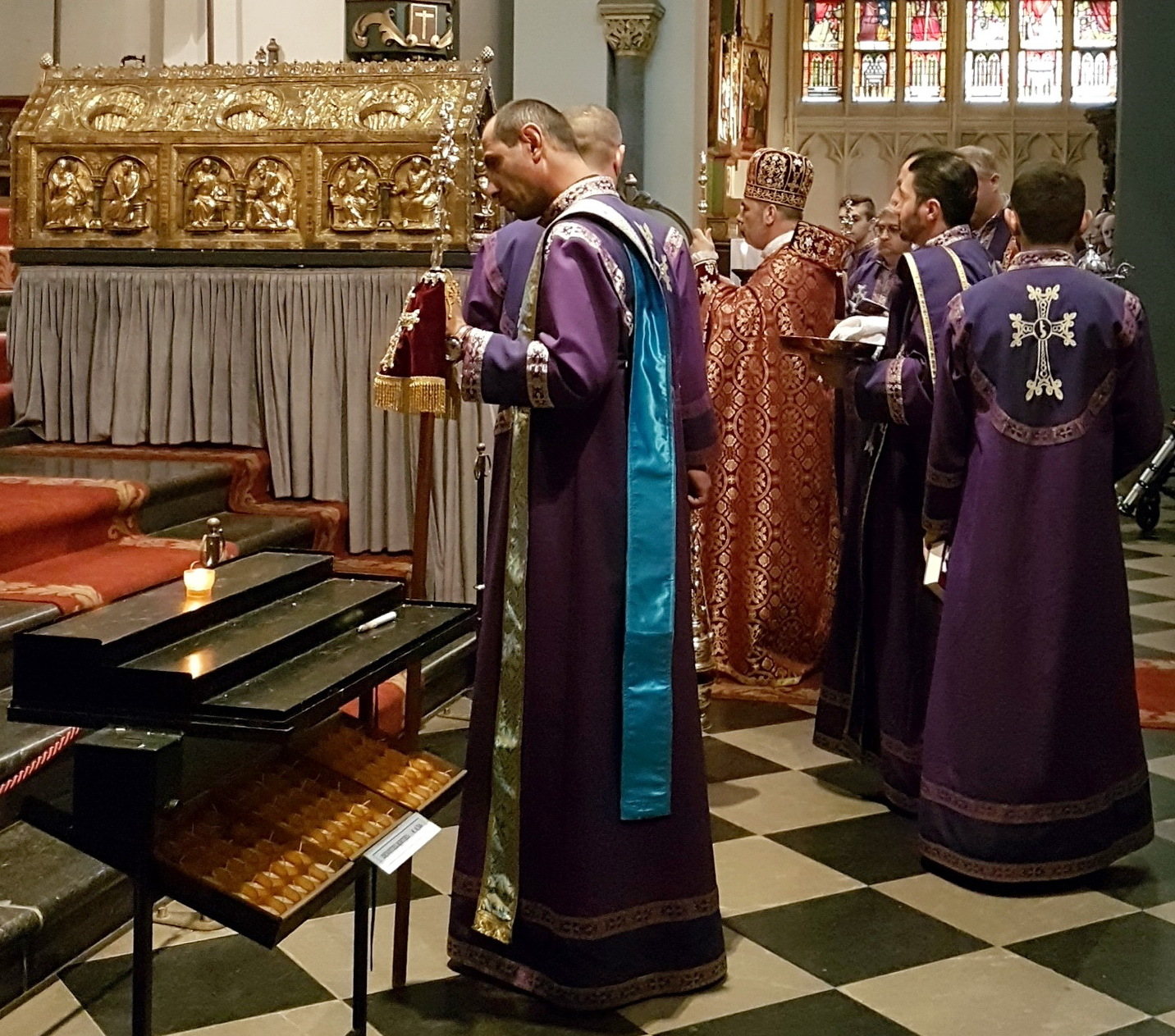
Armenian-Apostolic clergy gathered around the Noodkist

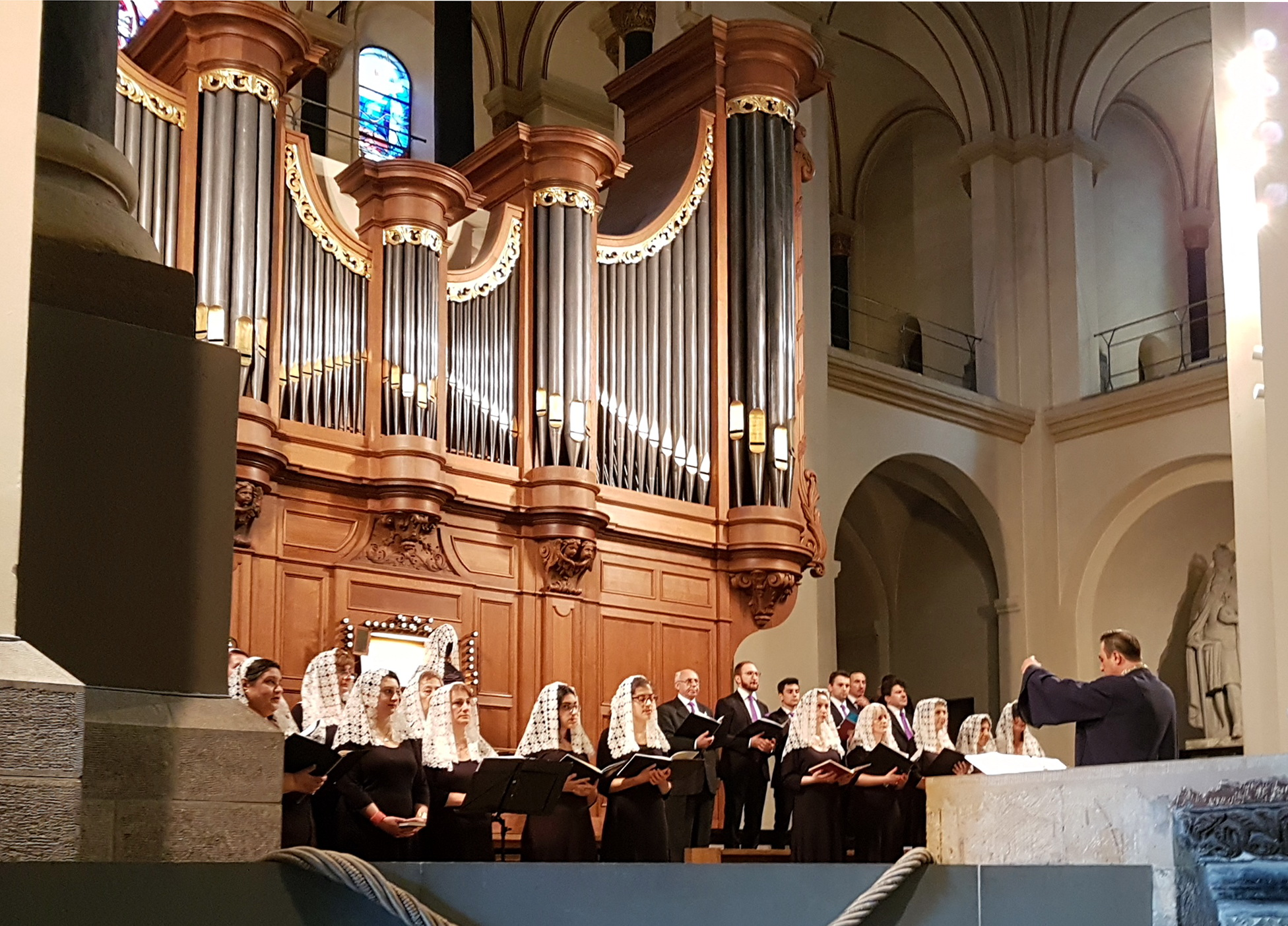
Armenian choir at the organ of St Servatius'

=== Displaying of the relics ===
The ceremonies of the displaying of the relics in the two main churches constitute the spiritual highlight of the pilgrimage and refer – more so than the processions or other activities – to its medieval origin. (Note: The Dutch novelist Nicolaas Matsier visited the Maastricht pilgrimage in 1997 and was most impressed by the relics display ("theatrically spoken, brilliant"). The procession, which had been his main goal, he considered disappointing. Nicolaas Matsier: 'Relieken en de Heiligdomsvaart in Maastricht; Een hot line met gene zijde'. In: NRC Handelsblad, 20 June 1997.) The modern way of showing the relics is not from the dwarf gallery but inside the churches, first in the Basilica of Our Lady, followed by the Basilica of St Servatius. (Note: Before 1990 the Basilica of St Servatius had no ceremony for displaying the relics; they were just on show in the church after the processions. In 1990 the relics display took place in both churches simultaneously. From 1997 on they take place at different times, so people can attend both events. Cf. the programmes of 'Heiligdomsvaart 1983' and 'Heiligdomsvaart 1990'. In: De Sint Servaas, p. 84 & pp. 408-409.) Compared to the medieval practice, more relics (also, different ones) are shown nowadays.

==== Relics display in the Basilica of Our Lady ====
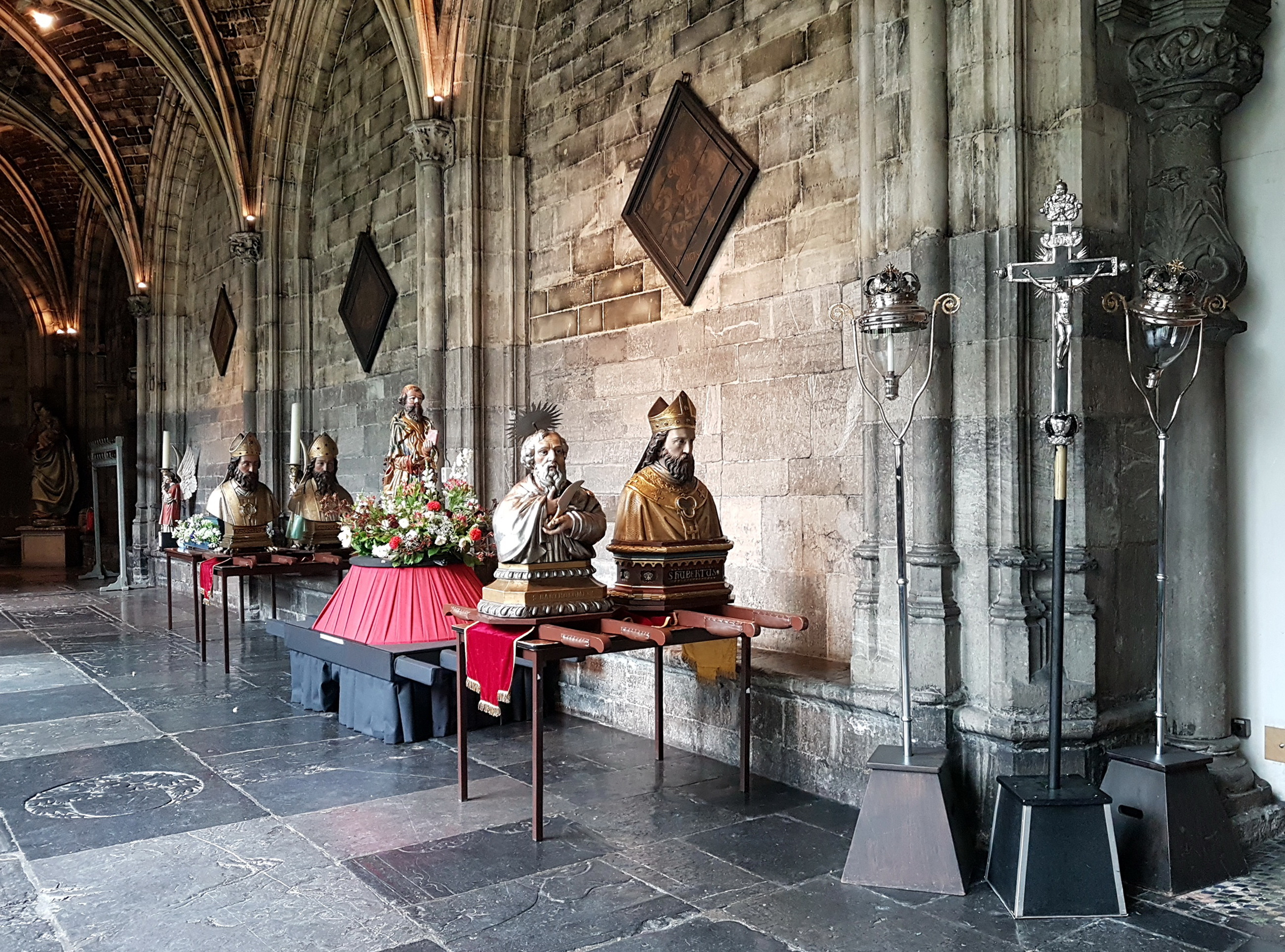
Reliquary busts in the cloisters of Our Lady's, waiting for the relics display, 2018

The relics display in the Basilica of Our Lady starts with a liturgical entrance procession in which the main relics from the treasury are brought into the church. While groups of carriers walk up the central aisle toward the choir stairs, the Litany of the Saints is sung. The carriers position themselves in a semicircle in the chancel area in front of the ambulatory. The service starts with a reading from the Gospel, after which the priest announces the relics with the medieval formula "Thou shall be shown..." The relics are shown in five groups. Each time a group has been announced the carriers step forward near the edge of the choir steps, then lifting up the reliquaries for a few seconds, so they can be seen by all. At no point are the relics taken out of their containers. A prayer is said and the carriers return to their position in the semicircle, after which the next group of relics is announced. In 2018 the order of showing was:

1. relics of Christian martyrs: the reliquary of the apostle Peter, the reliquary bust of the apostle Bartholomew, a Scandinavian reliquary horn with relics of the apostles Thomas, Andrew and Judas Thaddeus, and the reliquary arm of Saint Tranquillus (a saint associated with the Theban Legion);
2. relics of the holy bishops of Maastricht: the reliquary busts of Servatius, Monulph, Gondulph and Hubert;
3. relics of holy women: the reliquary of the girdle of Saint Mary, Mary's wedding ring, relics of Mary Magdalene, Catherine of Siena and Bernadette Soubirous;
4. relics of holy men: a reliquary with oil from the grave of Saint Nicholas, a relic of Saint Roch and a relic of Saint Giles;
5. relics of Jesus: a staurothèque (cross reliquary) with relics of the True Cross (a papal present in gratitude of the donation of the Byzantine double cross).

After the blessing, given with the cross reliquary, a procession is formed once more, taking the relics to the north transept where they are exhibited for about an hour. Members of the congregation can then approach the relics, touch them, take photographs and venerate them.

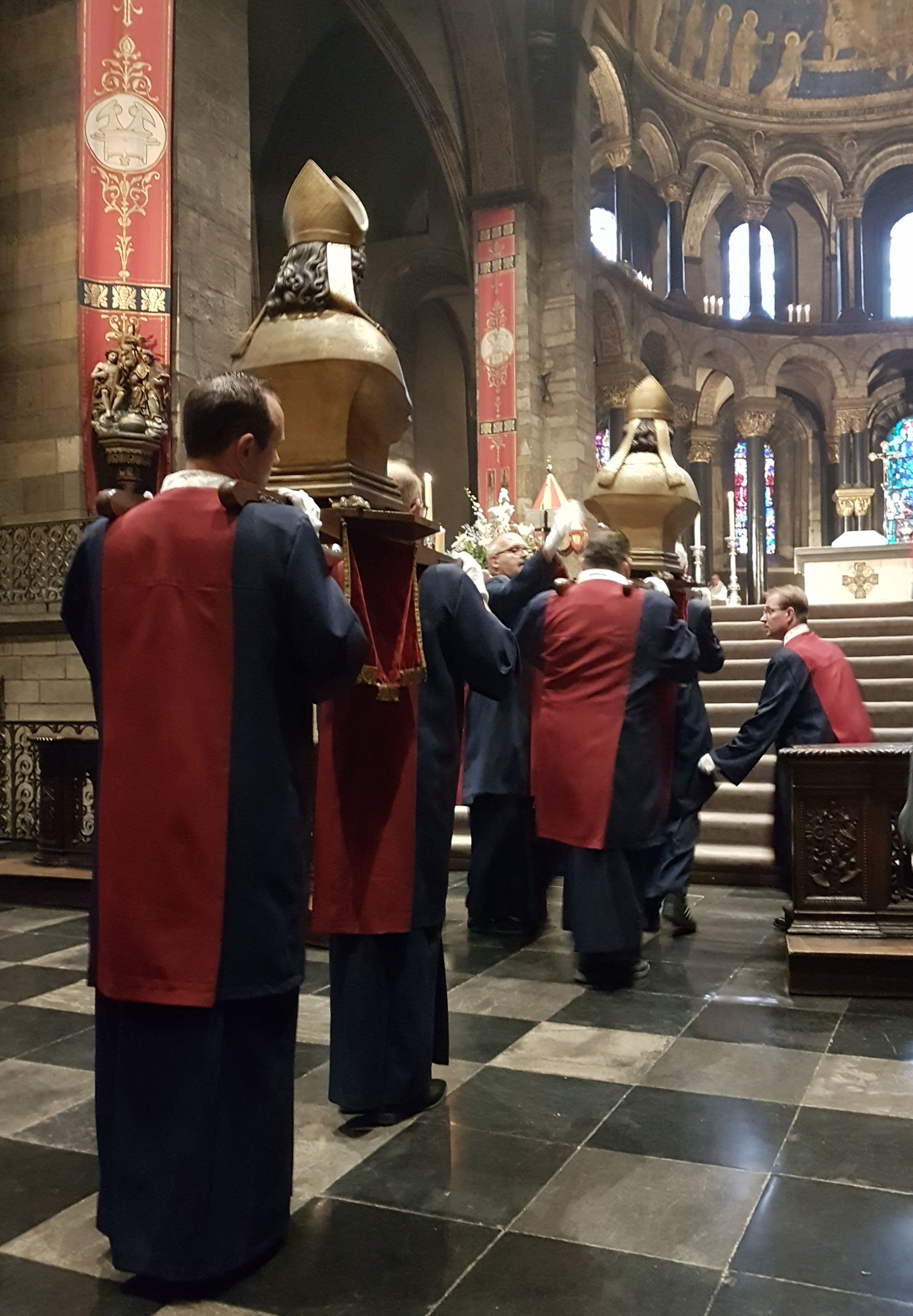
Reliquary busts approaching the choir stairs

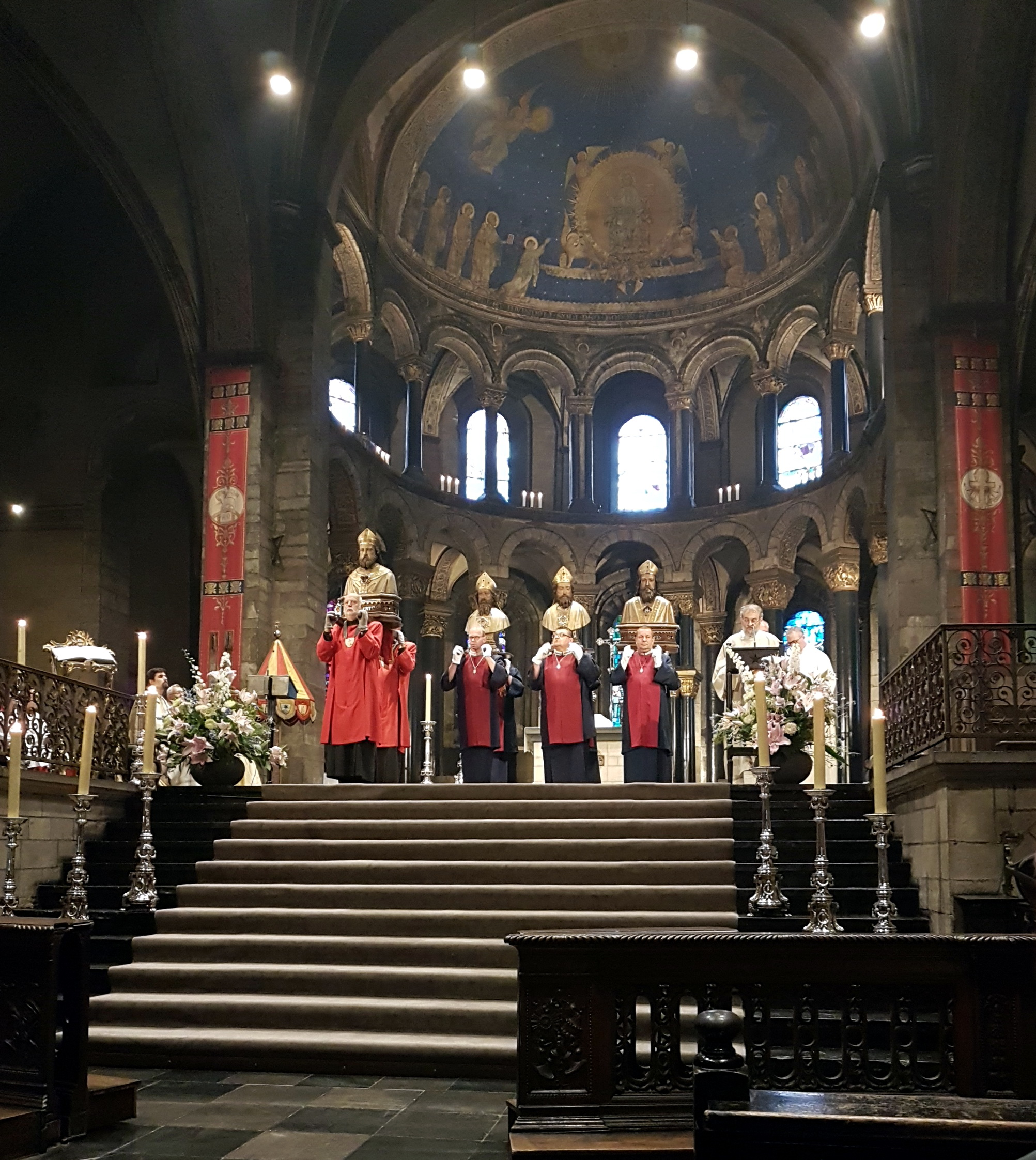
Busts of bishops of Maastricht being shown

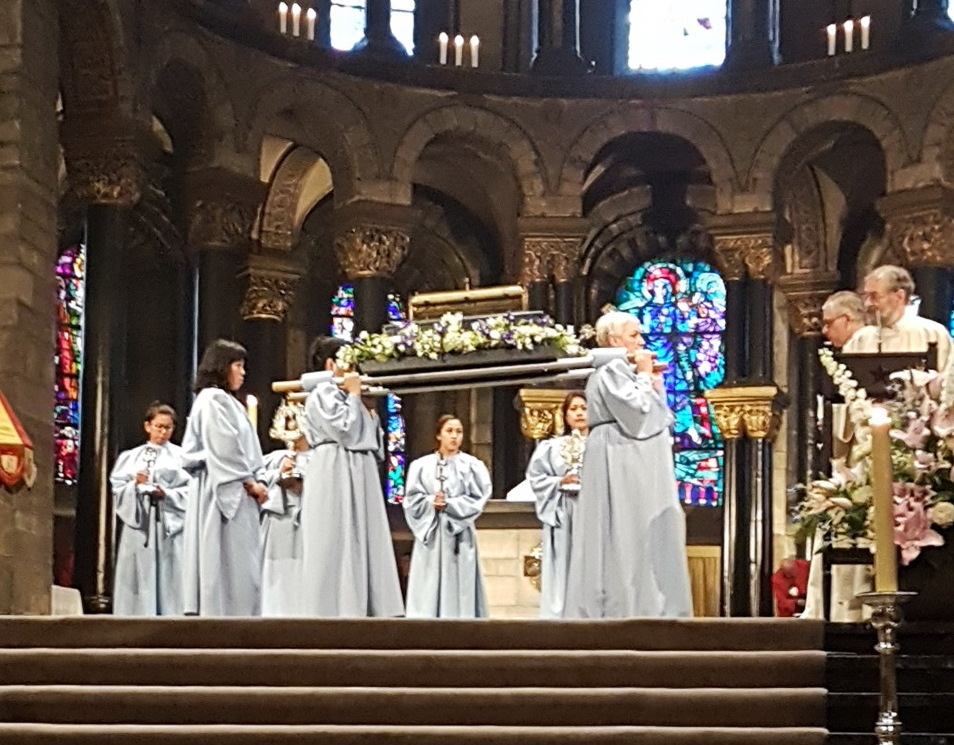
The girdle of Saint Mary being shown

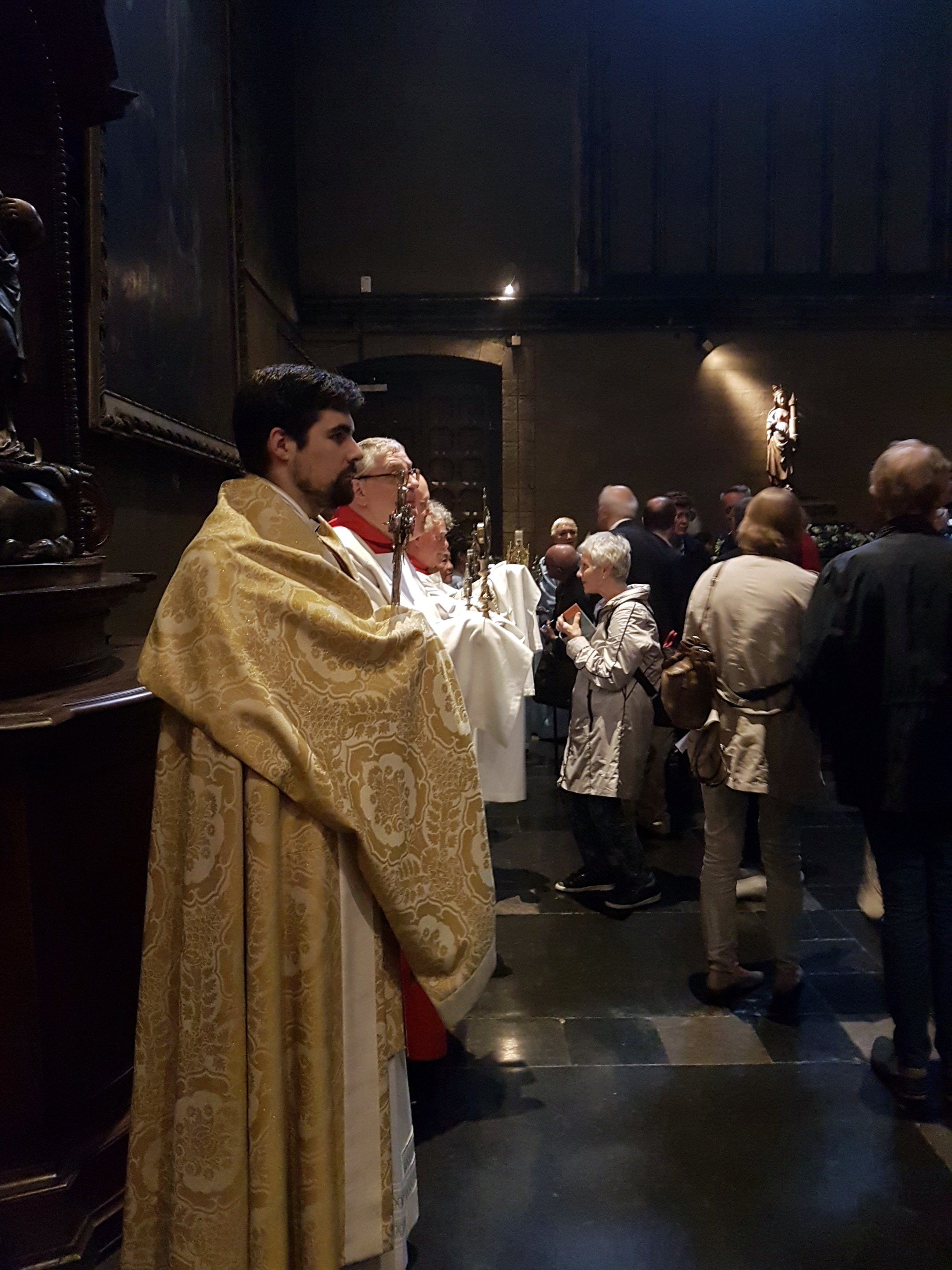
The cross reliquary on display in the north transept

==== Relics display in the Basilica of St Servatius ====
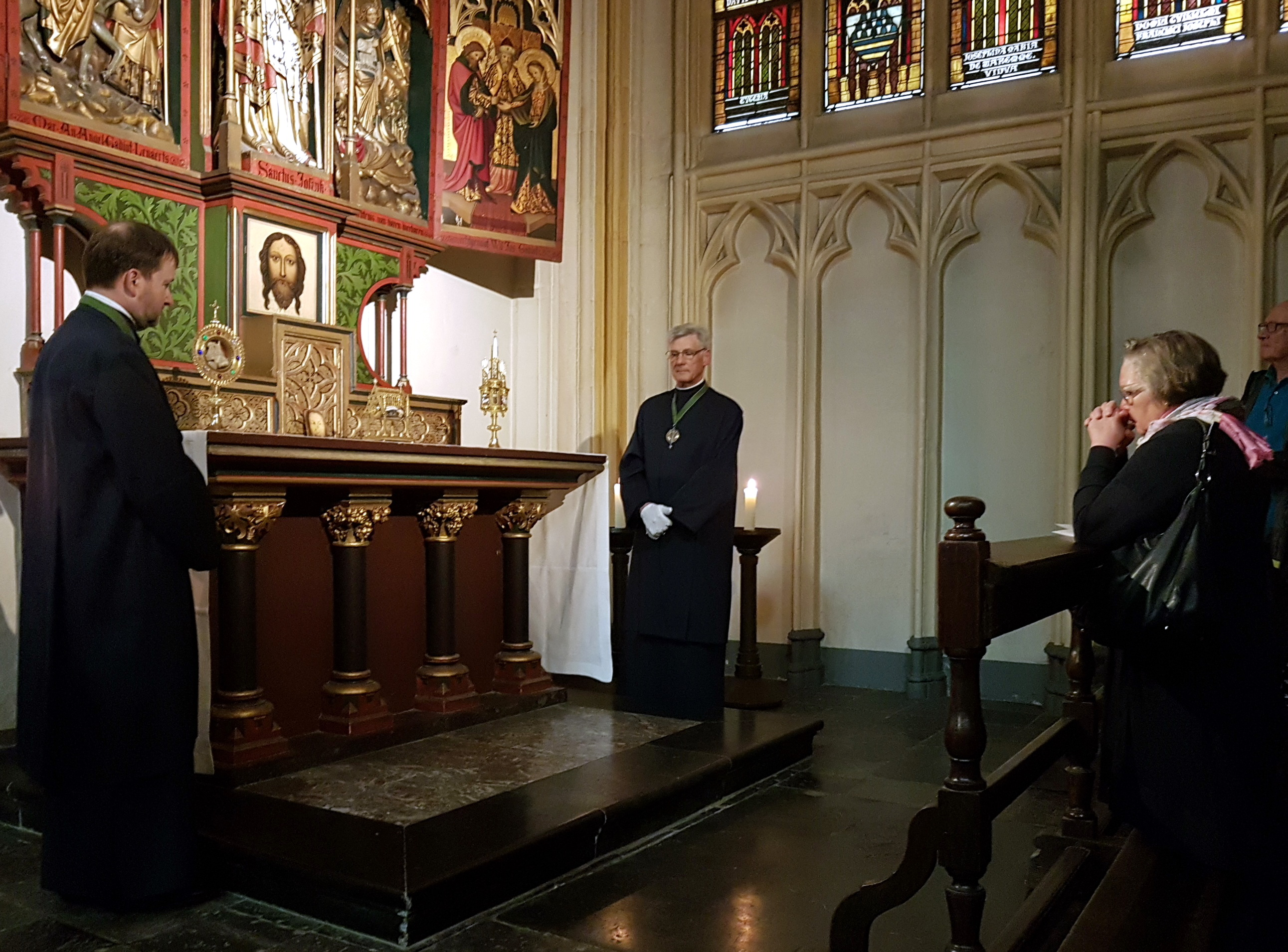
Adoration of relics in the Chapel of Saint Joseph (after the displaying ceremony)

More or less the same procedure is followed in the Basilica of St Servatius, with some differences. The formula "Thou shall be shown..." is sung here by a cantor. Each time a group of relics is shown, a short fanfare sounds from the west choir of the church, adding to the dramatic effect. Also, after having been shown, the relics do not return to the chancel area, but are immediately taken down the choir steps into the side chapels. Here they remain, guarded by members of confraternities. This means that, unlike at Our Lady's, the chancel is virtually empty at the end of the service. It is remarkable that the arm reliquary of Saint Thomas and most of the Servatiana (see below: 'List of devotional objects/Servatiana'), which were so pivotal in the medieval relics display, are no longer shown. The current order of showing is:

1. relics of Jesus: the patriarchal cross of 1490 with relics of the True Cross;
2. relics of holy men: (Note: In 1955 this group of relics was subdivided into: apostles, martyrs and confessors. See: R. de la Haye, 'Geschiedenis van de Maastrichtse Heiligdomsvaart'. In: Van Rensch/Koldeweij/De la Haye/De Kreek (1990), p. 119.) reliquaries of Marcellinus and Peter, Saint Blaise, Saint Livinus, Saint Amor and Saint Gerlach;
3. relics of holy women: reliquaries of Saint Agnes, Saint Barbara, Saint Cecilia, Saint Amelberga and the blessed Clara Fey;
4. relics of holy bishops of Maastricht: the reliquary busts of Monulph, Gondulph and Lambert, and the reliquary horn of Hubert;
5. relics of Saint Servatius: the key of Saint Servatius, his pectoral cross, the reliquary bust and the shrine of Saint Servatius (which remains immobile).

After the conclusion of the ceremony the relics are exhibited in the side aisles and chapels, in order to be admired and venerated. Members of various confraternities and guilds keep watch over them.

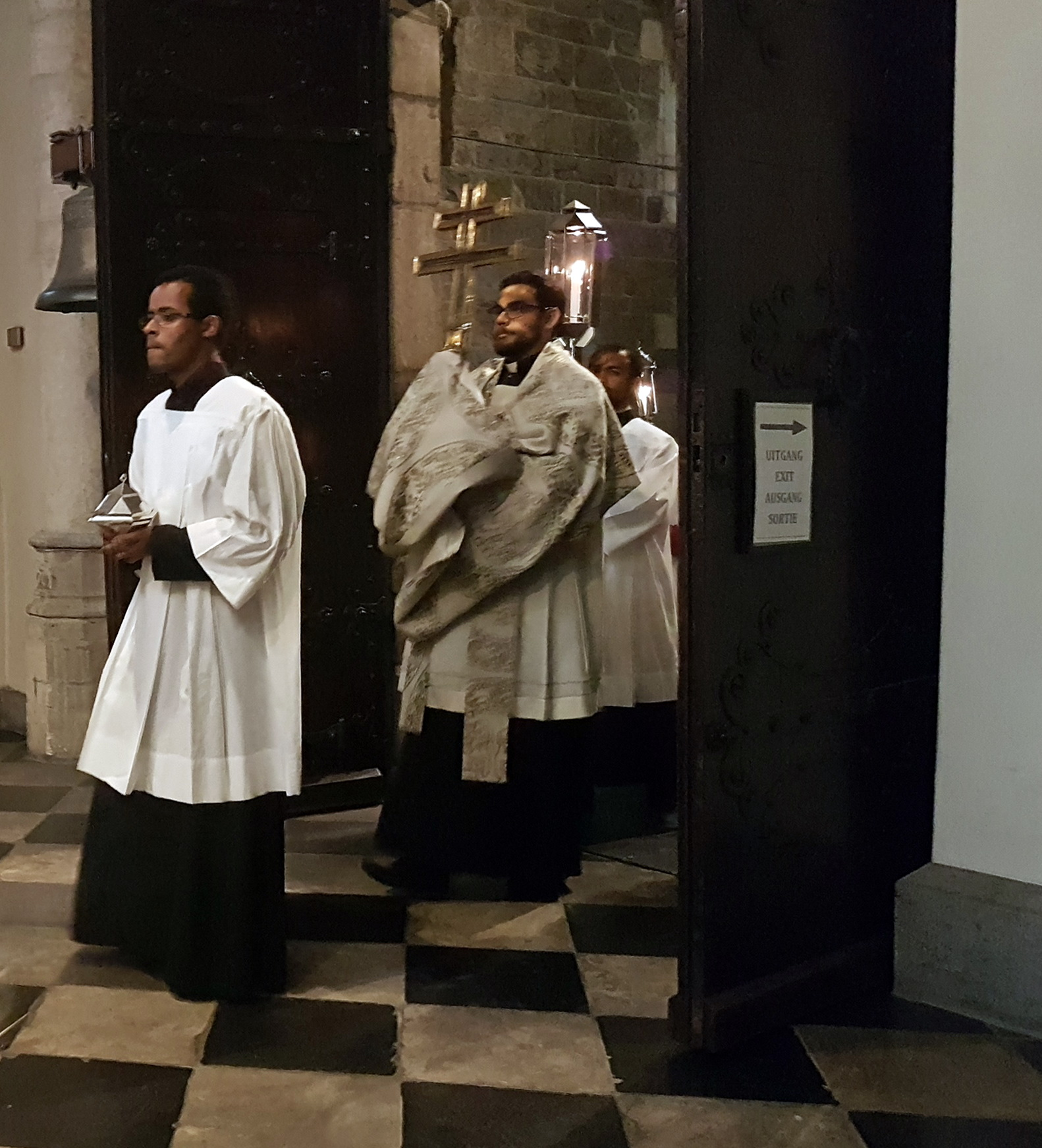
The patriarchal cross at the entry procession

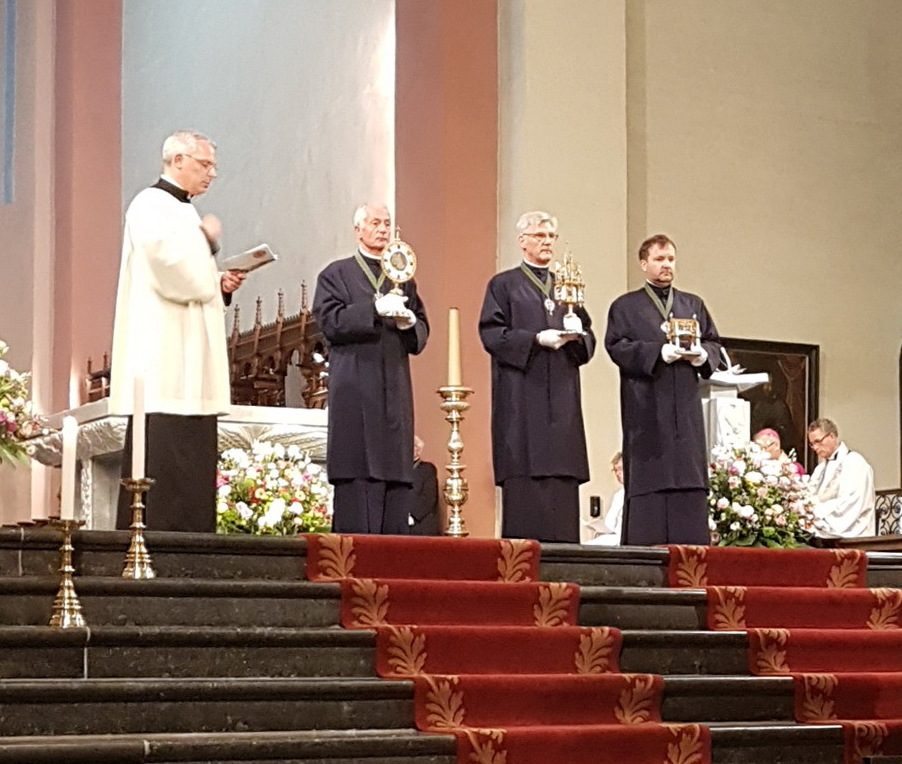
Three small reliquaries being shown

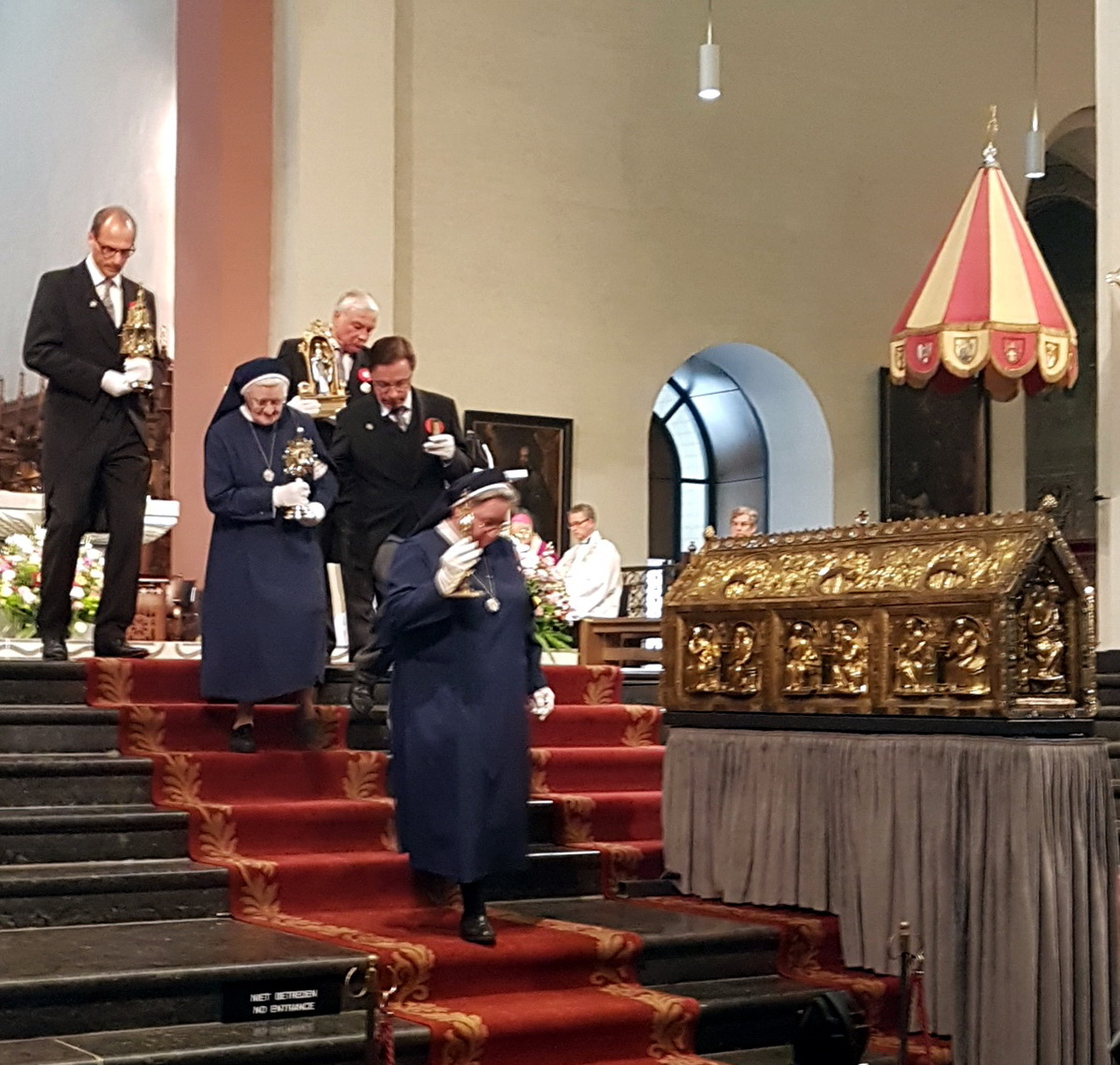
Nuns with reliquaries on the choir stairs

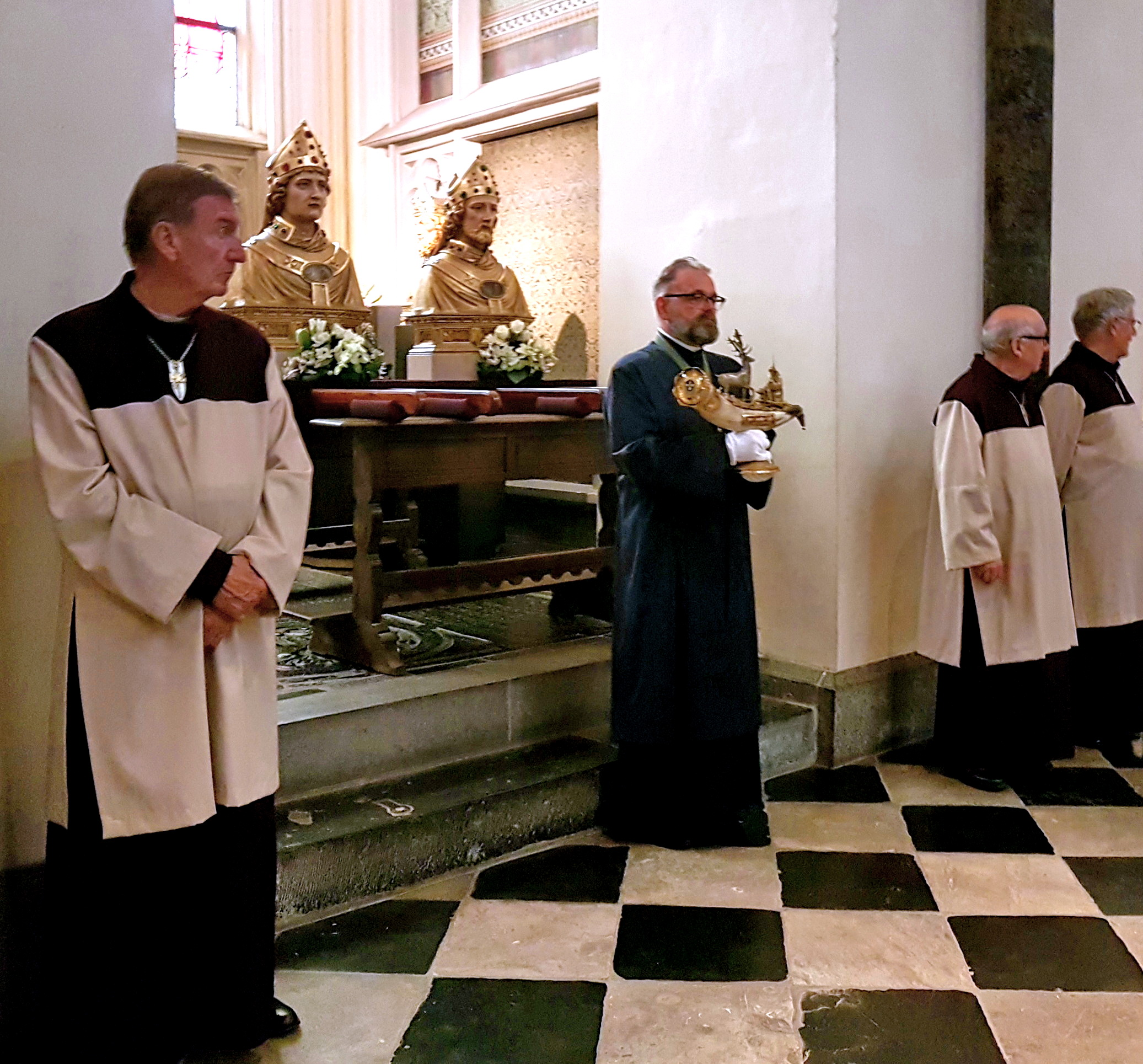
Relics on display in the side chapels

=== Processions ===
The two outdoor processions – not to be confounded with the liturgical processions inside the churches – are perhaps the most iconic aspect of the Maastricht pilgrimage. The colourful parades on both Sundays are watched by ten thousands of people, as well as being televised. Additionally, there are a number of smaller processions, such as the opening procession, the 'Star Procession' (departing from various parish churches), and the children's procession (with self-made reliquary shrines).

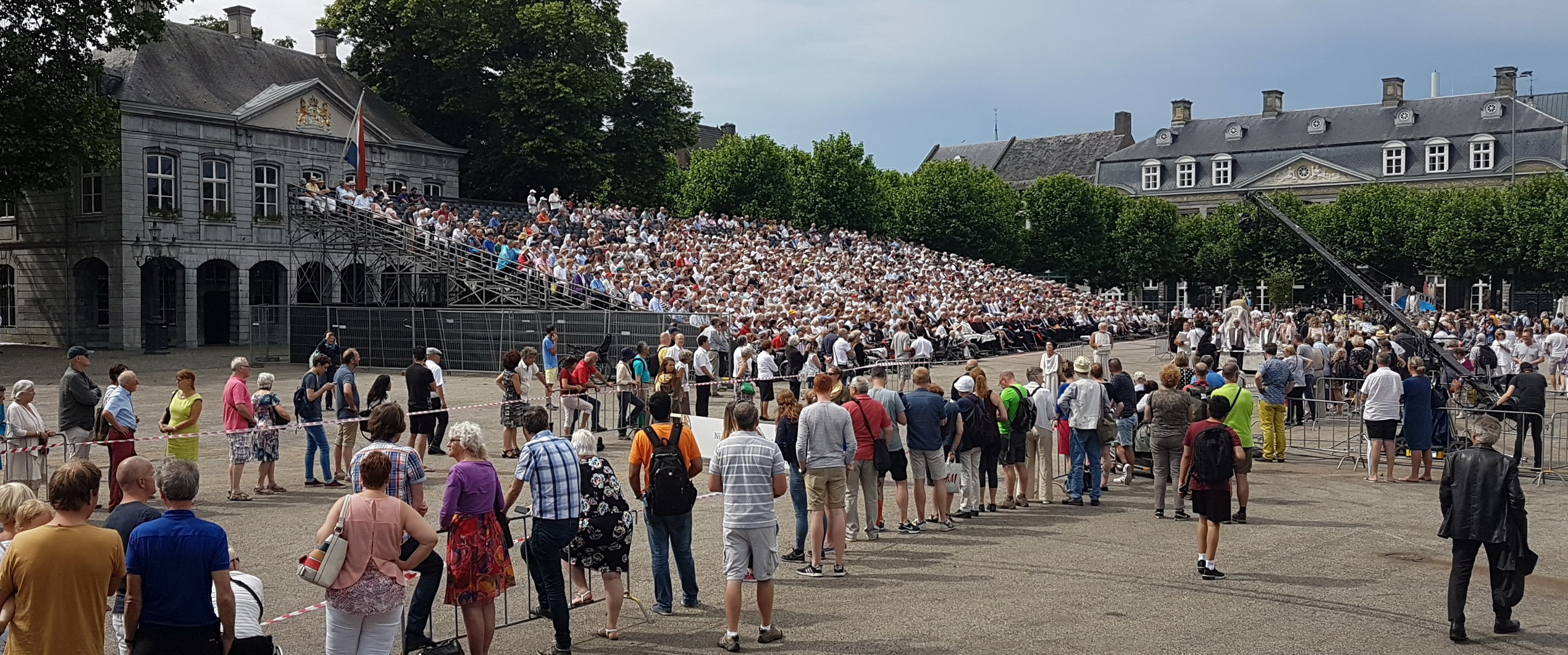
Spectator stand and TV filming at Vrijthof during the first procession, 27 May 2018

The route of the main procession on the first Sunday starts in Wyck and passes over the Saint Servatius Bridge. A week later the starting point is in Jekerkwartier from where it goes to Onze Lieve Vrouweplein and along the Meuse. Both routes continue via Markt towards Vrijthof. Here, in the Basilica of St Servatius, a short service is held, ending with the singing of the Hymn of Saint Servatius. (Note: First mentioned in 1923 as being part of the pilgrimage. 'Kerknieuws. De zevenjaarlijksche Heiligdomsvaart te Maastricht' in De Tijd, 23 July 1923 (on website resolver.kb.nl).) In Vrijthof, and sometimes in Markt or Sint Pieterstraat, the procession can be watched from a spectator stand. The first rows at the Vrijthof stand are usually reserved for guests such as bishops, cabinet ministers, the governor of Limburg, the mayor of Maastricht and other dignitaries. Television recordings usually take place at Vrijthof.

Since the 1960s, the organizers of the processions have found it increasingly difficult to involve local participants, especially children and young adults. As a result, traditional groups of altar servers, choir boys, scouting groups and 'brides' (young women dressed in white) have largely disappeared. The same has happened to Catholic women's associations and workers' associations. Their place has now been taken by non-religious, historical and folkloristic groups, or in some cases by religious groups from elsewhere (e.g. the Singing Virgins of Tongeren).

==== Carrier groups ====
About half of the participants in the processions are members of confraternities, carriers guilds or other groups that are involved in carrying and escorting the holy objects assigned to them. The Confraternity of Saint Servatius for instance is responsible for the safety of the reliquary chest of Saint Servatius (or Noodkist), while the Saint Servatius Guild is concerned with the bust of Saint Servatius. Other groups take care of the bust of Saint Lambert, the busts of Saint Monulph and Saint Gondulph, the statue of Our Lady, Star of the Sea, or other statues. The larger objects are carried on a processional litter (comparable to a paso in Spanish processions but usually smaller), decorated with flowers. The carriers are dressed formally (in morning dress or white tie) or wear pseudo-liturgical tunics. In order to move the larger litters usually two teams of 12 or 16 carriers are needed. Other members carry processional lanterns or poles decorated with confraternity medals. Smaller objects are carried by single participants, previously often by priests or nuns, nowadays mostly by seminarists or other laymen. They usually wear white gloves and/or hold the objects with the wide sleeves of their gowns.

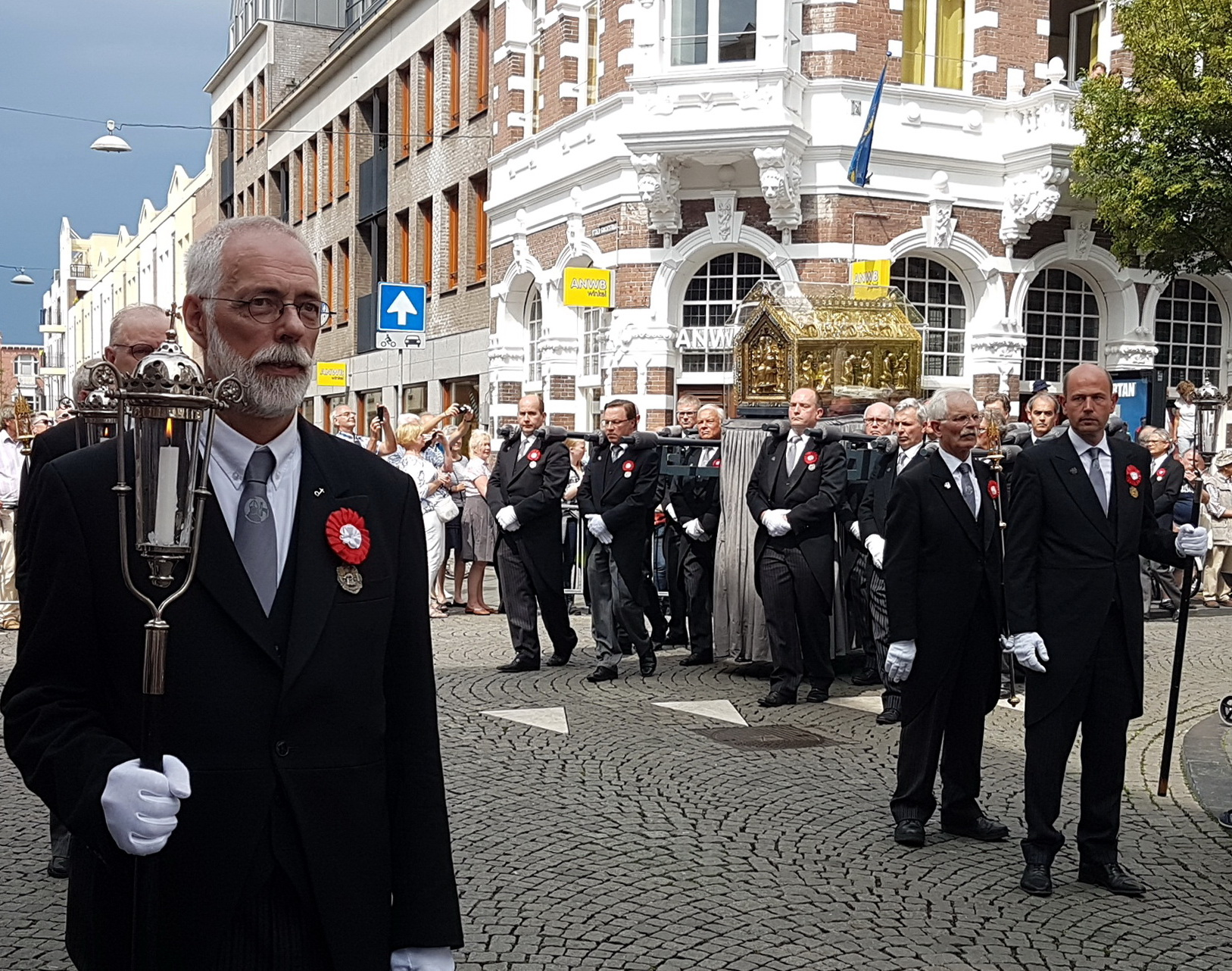
Confraternity of Saint Servatius with Noodkist

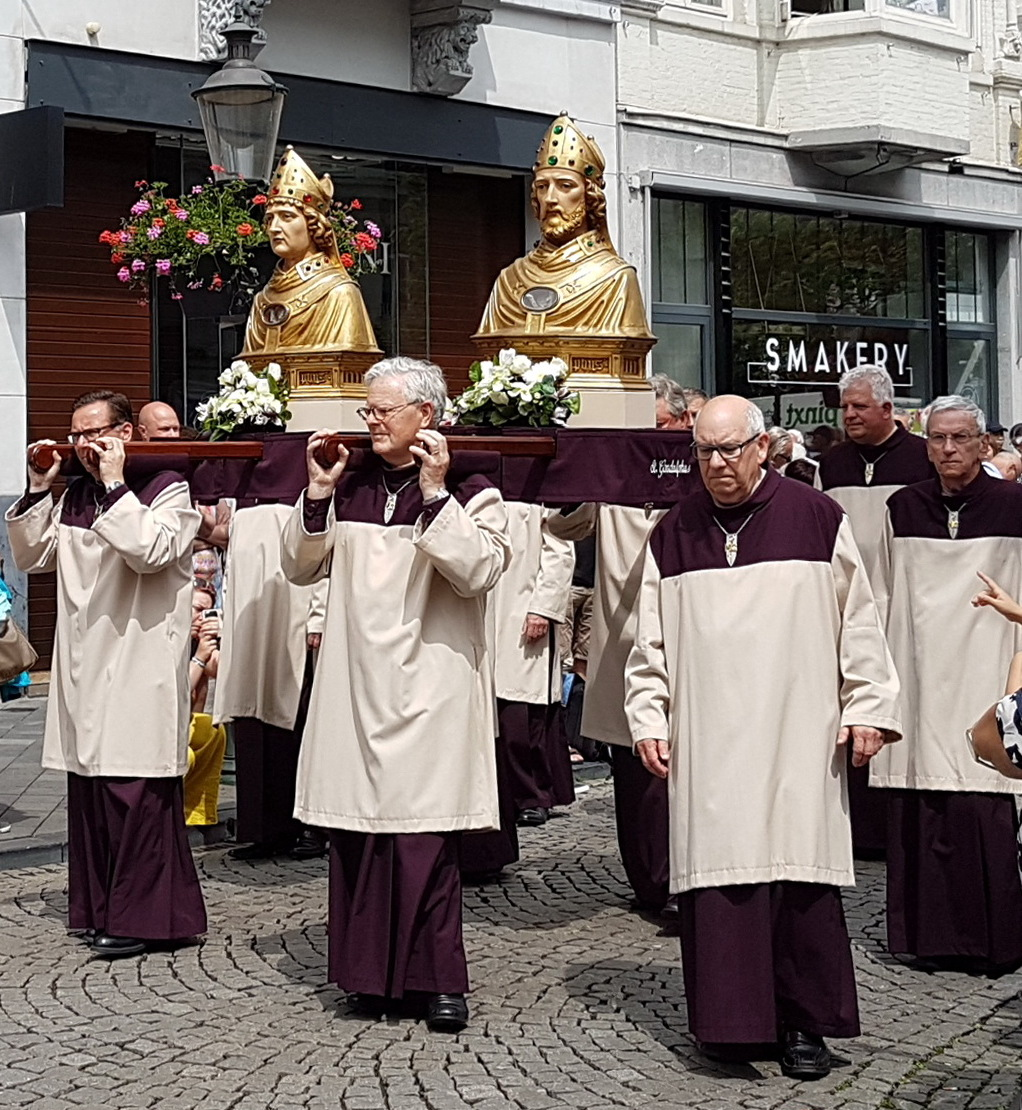
Carriers Guild of Saint Monulph and Gondulph

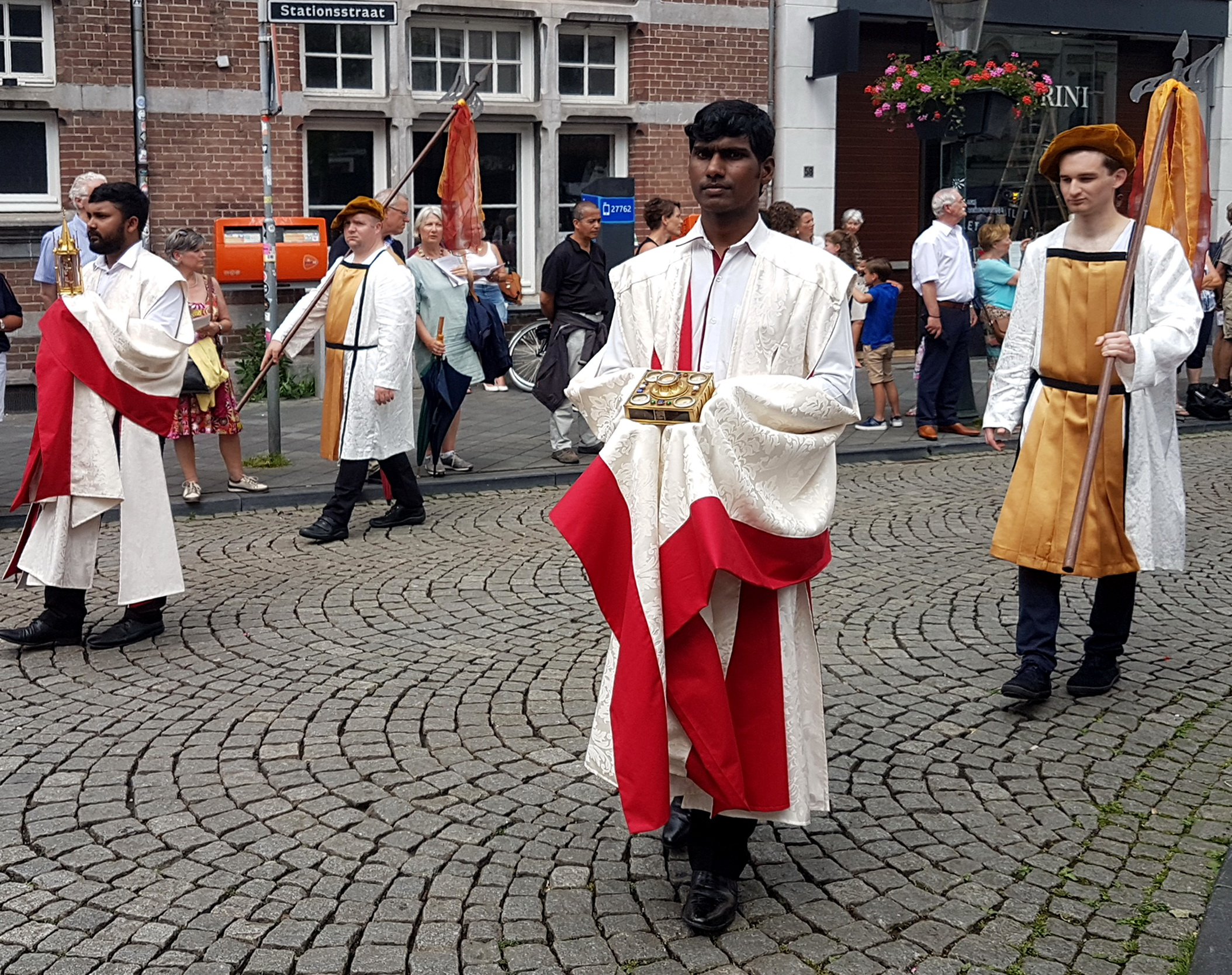
Seminarists carrying 'minor' reliquaries

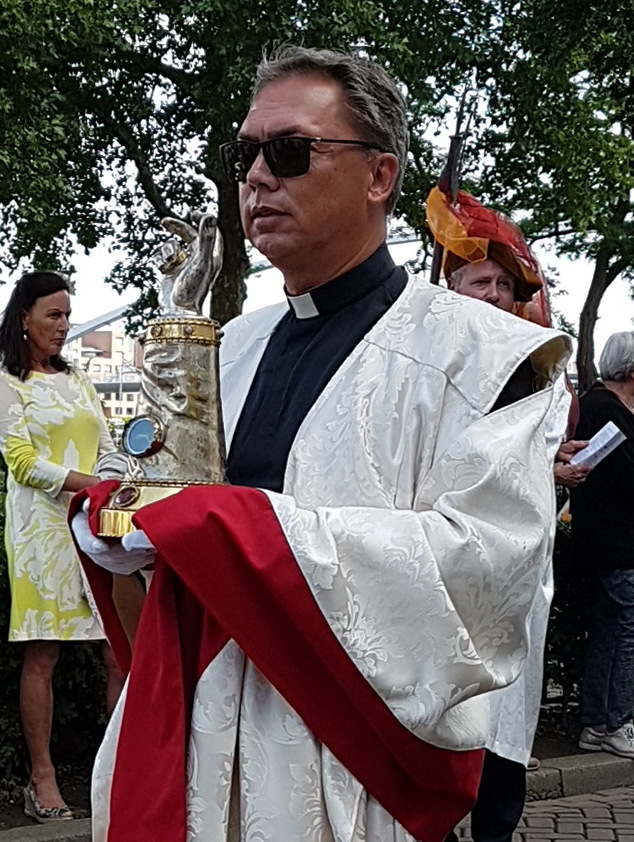
A priest carrying an arm reliquary

==== Theme groups ====
Since the 1960s or 70s a theme is chosen for each edition of the pilgrimage. In the processions, the theme provides a guideline for those groups that attempt to present the Gospel to an increasingly non-religious audience. In 2018 the theme Do good and do not look back was presented by several local amateur theatre groups. Some participants reenacted themes from the Old and New Testament, others focussed on Catholic themes like Saint Servatius, Pope Francis and the Holy Sacraments. A group of students from the Roman Catholic seminaries of Rolduc and Liège carried reproductions of a painting by the Master of Alkmaar, illustrating the Seven Works of Mercy. As an answer to this, members of the Protestant Church in the Netherlands carried drawings by school children with the same theme in a contemporary context.

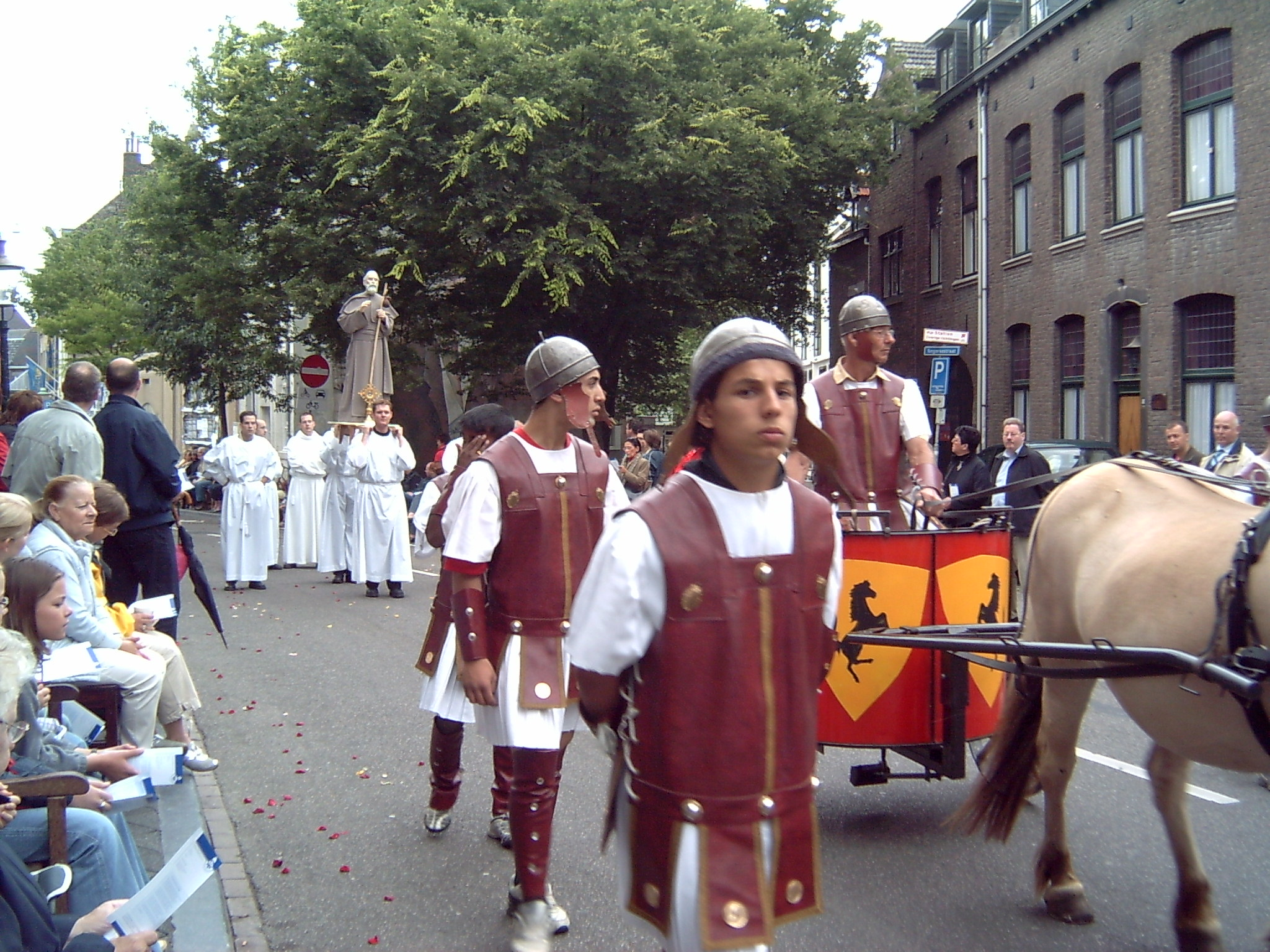
Reenactment group, 2004

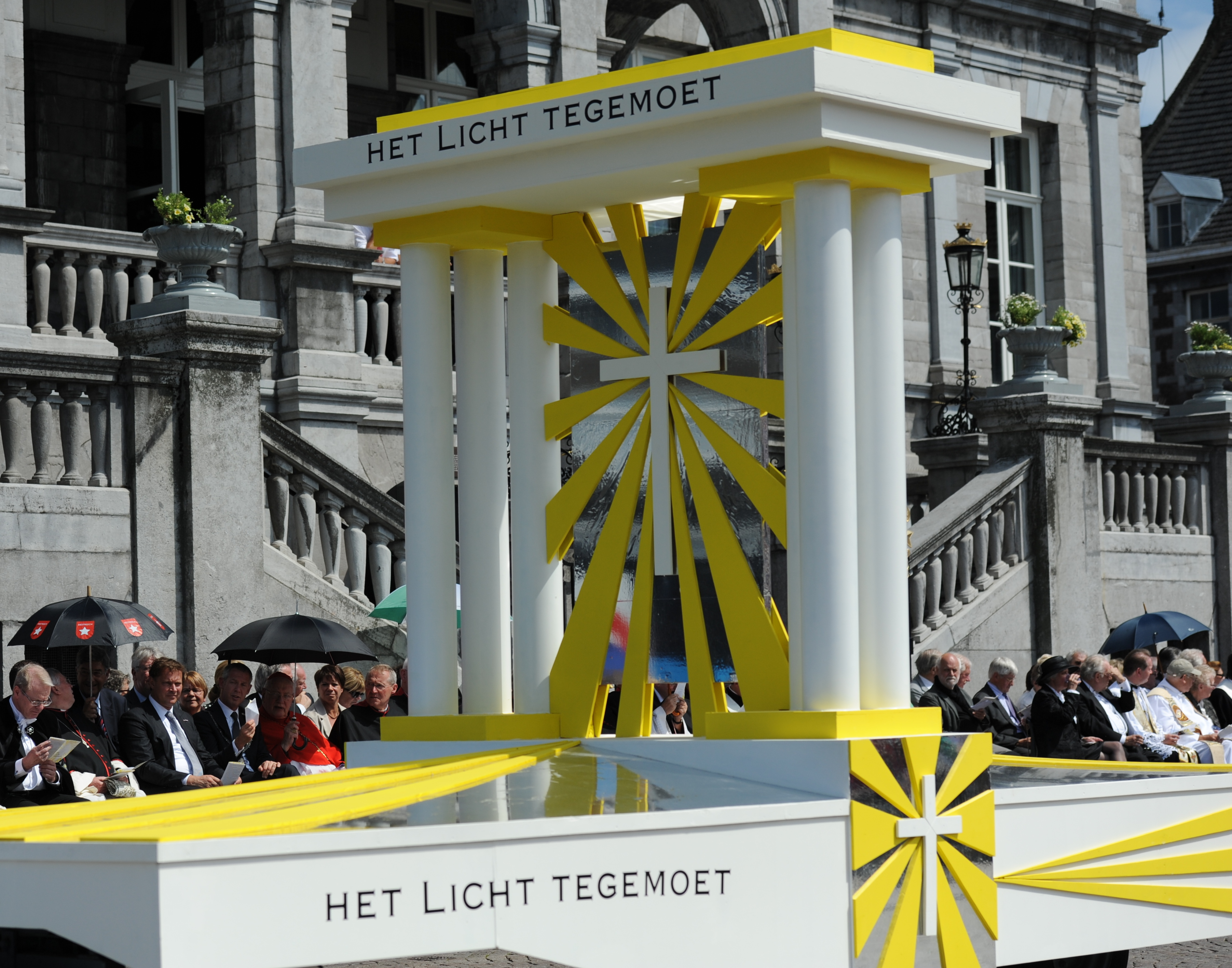
Theme presentation, 2011

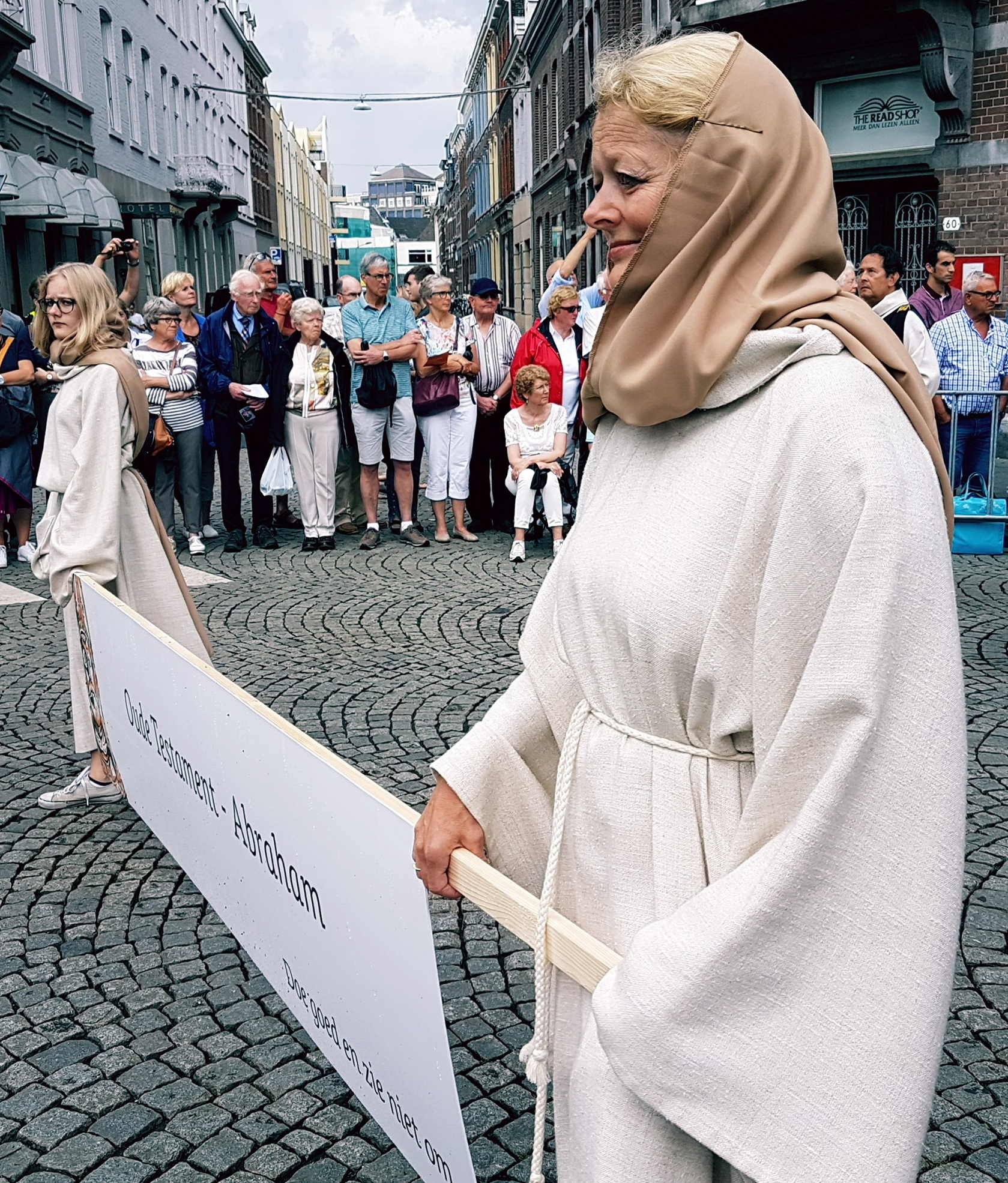
Old Testament presentation

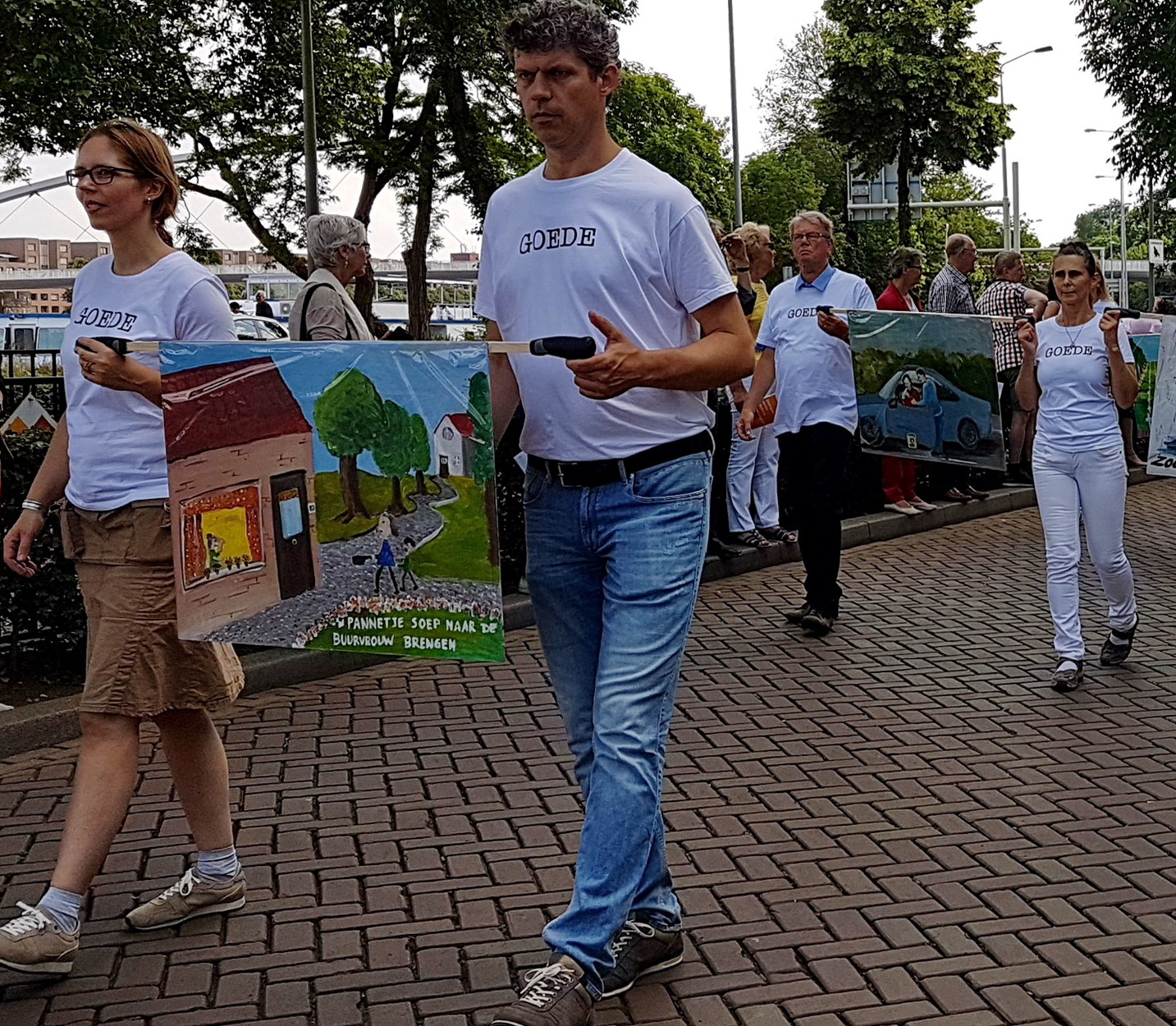
Modern Works of Mercy

==== Representational groups ====
As there have been less participants from local churches in recent years, there is more room for other groups, from other denominations, from other cultural backgrounds or from other towns. In 2018 there were local representatives of the Protestant Church in the Netherlands (see above), the Russian Orthodox Church, the Armenian Apostolic Church, the Philippine community (with an Ave Maria theme), the Antillian community (with a gospel group), the Order of the Holy Sepulchre, the Order of Saint Lazarus, the OSMTH Order of the Knights Templar, the Bund der St. Sebastianus Schützenjugend (with the Aachener Friedenskreuz or Aachen Peace Cross) and the Sisters of the Poor Child Jesus (with a banner commemorating the beatification of their founder, Clara Fey).

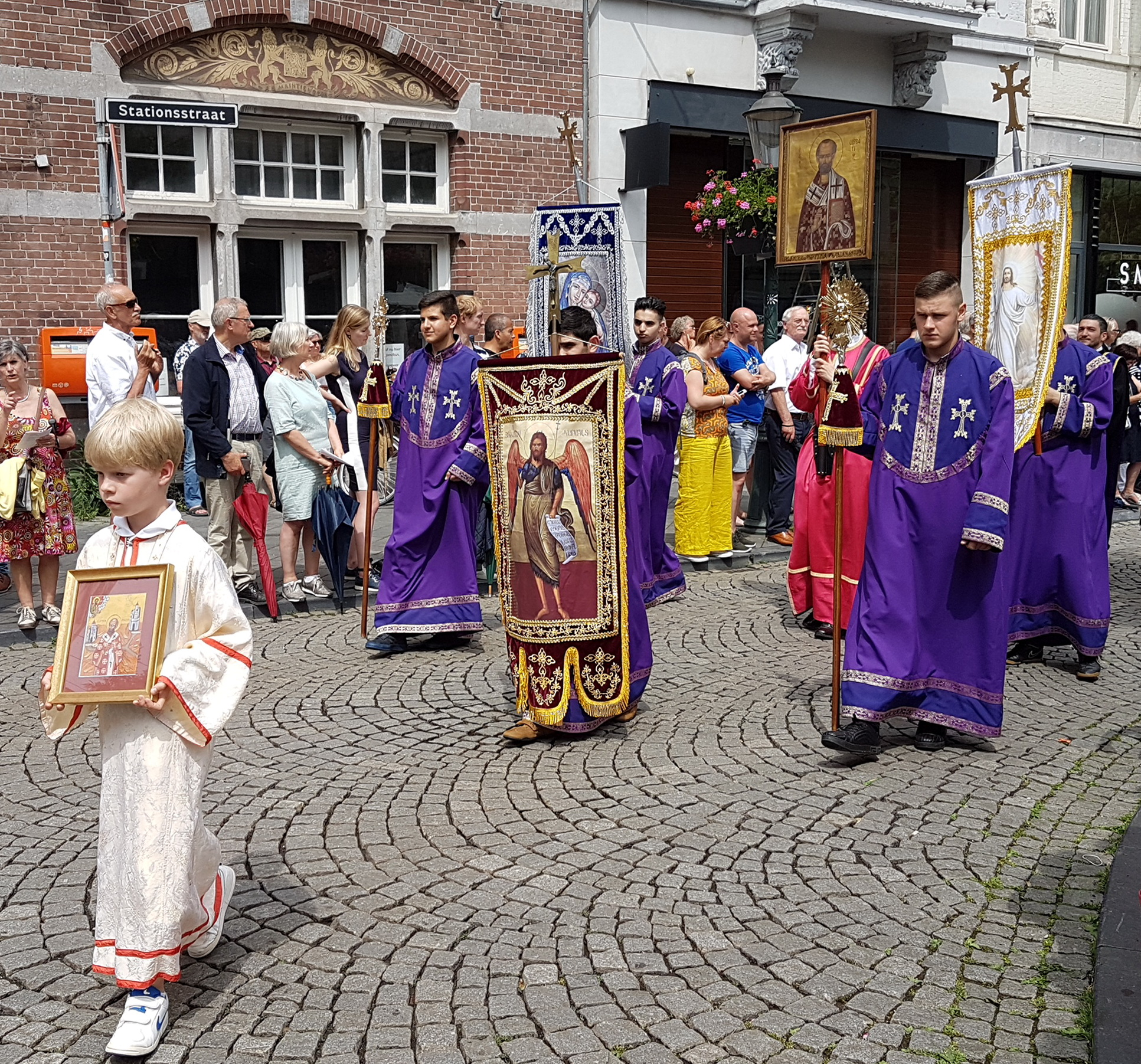
Deputies of Orthodox and Armenian churches

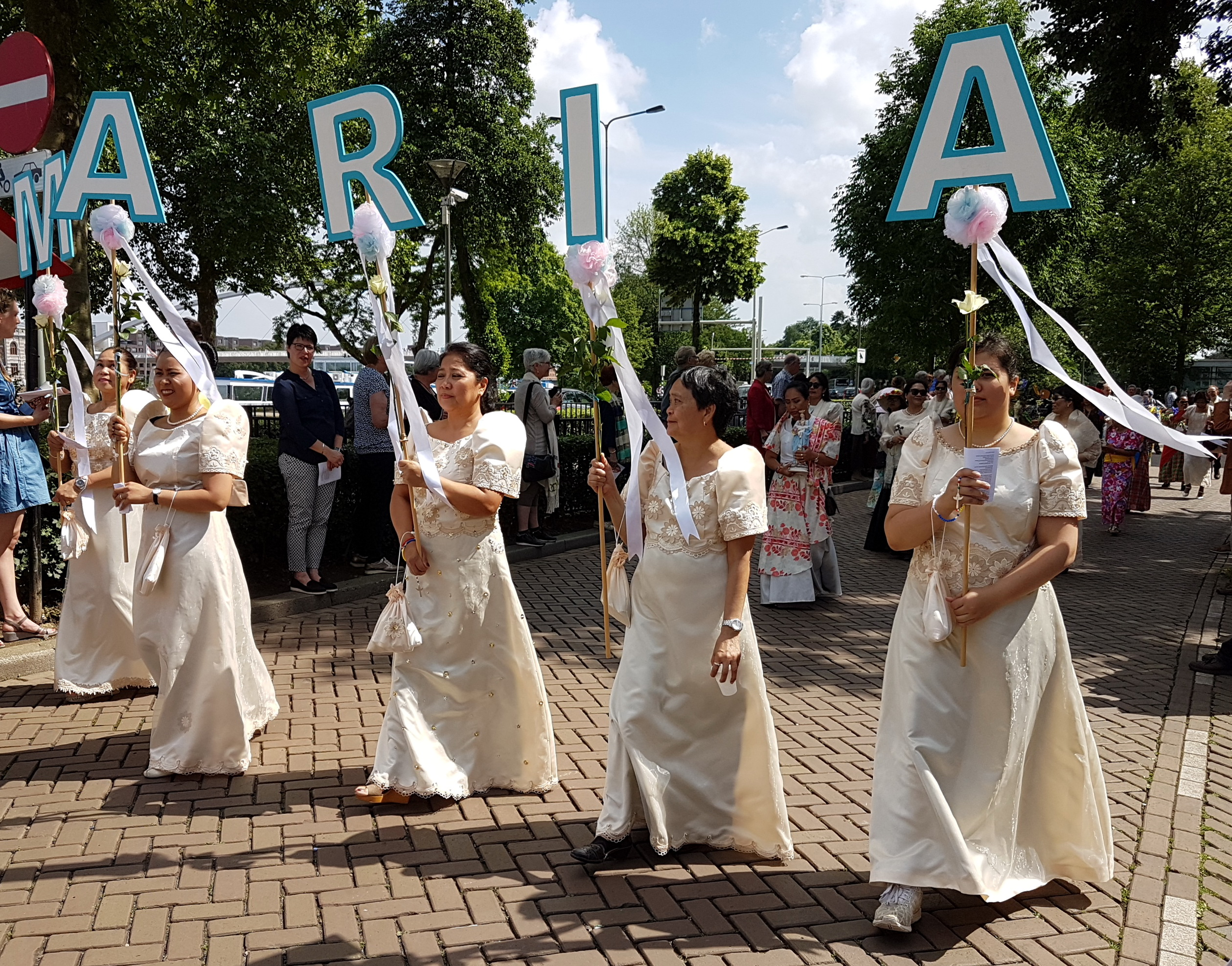
Filippine Marital group

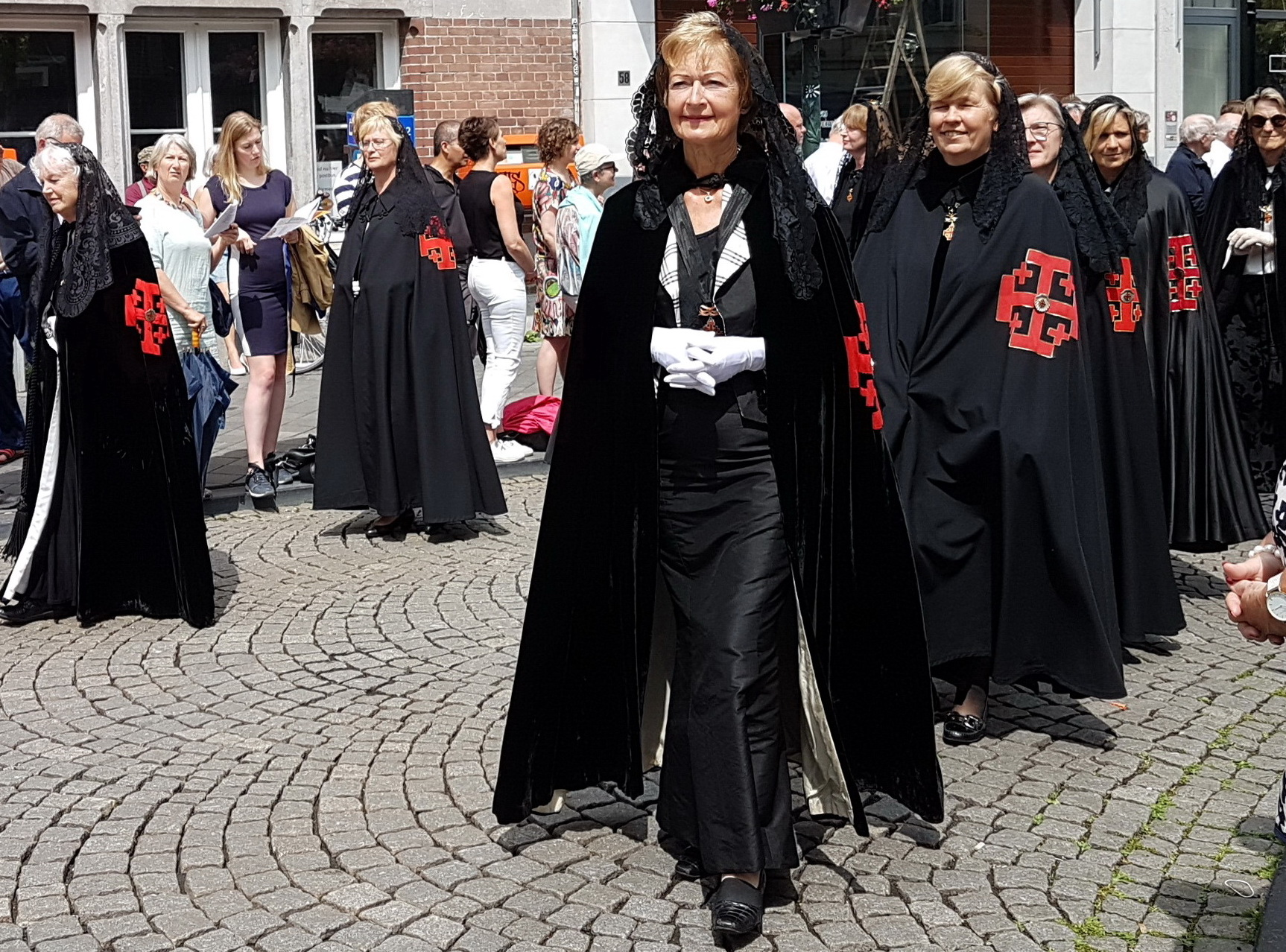
Order of the Holy Sepulchre of Jerusalem

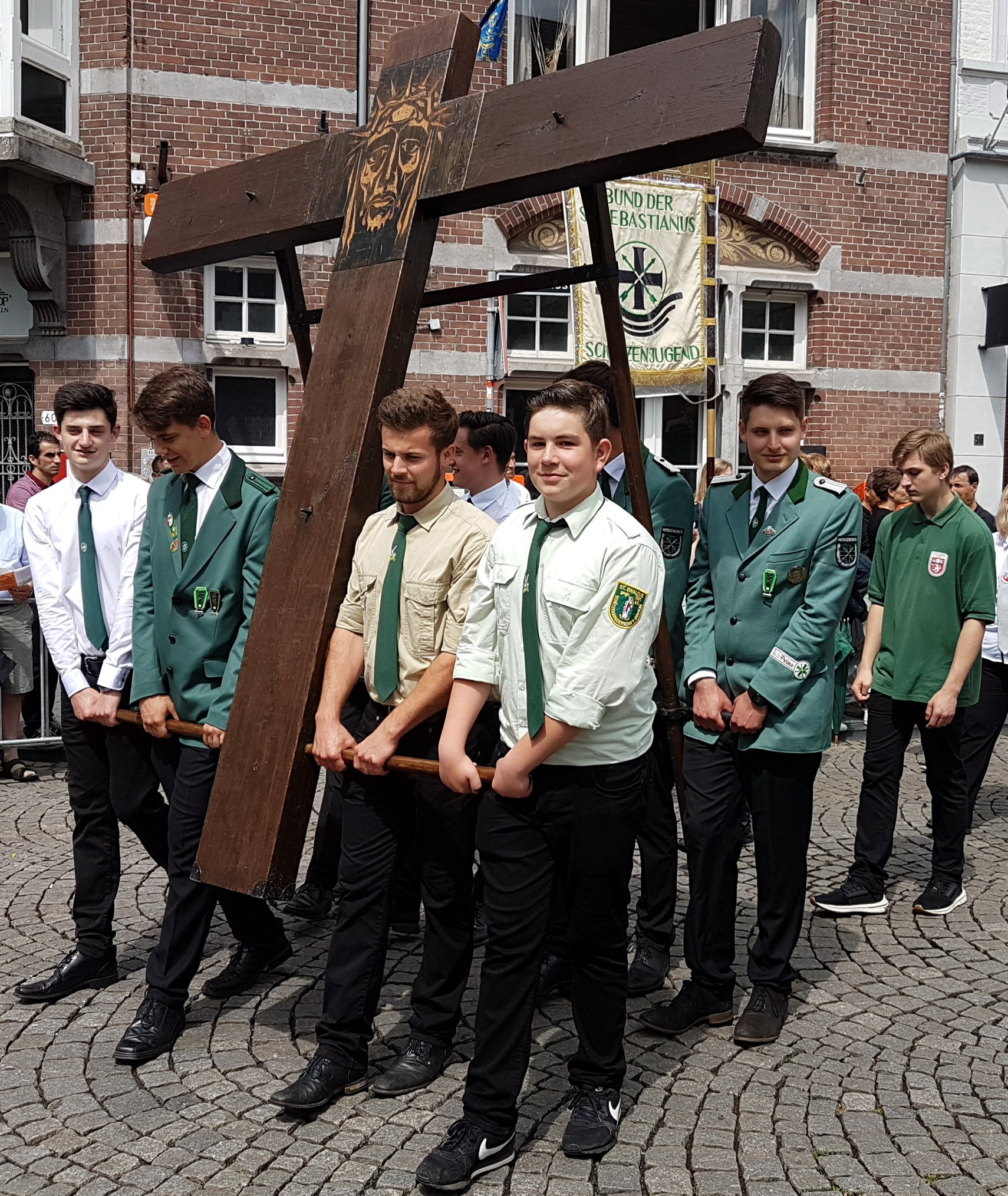
German youth group with Aachen Peace Cross

==== Music and folklore groups ====
Church choirs, marching bands, fanfare orchestras, drum bands, guilds of flag throwers and folkloristic militias (Dutch: schutterijen) have been part of religious processions in this part of Europe for a long time. In the Heiligdomsvaart processions the Basilica Choir (the main choir of Our Lady's) accompanies the statue of the Star of the Sea, while the Cappella Sancti Servatii (the choir of St Servatius') walks in front of the bust of Saint Servatius. A position of honour is given to the marching band that walks behind the Noodkist, thus closing the procession. On the first Sunday in 2018 this was the Royal Harmonie Sainte Cécile of Eijsden; on the second Sunday it was the Harmonie Sint Petrus en Paulus from the Maastricht neighbourhood of Wolder.

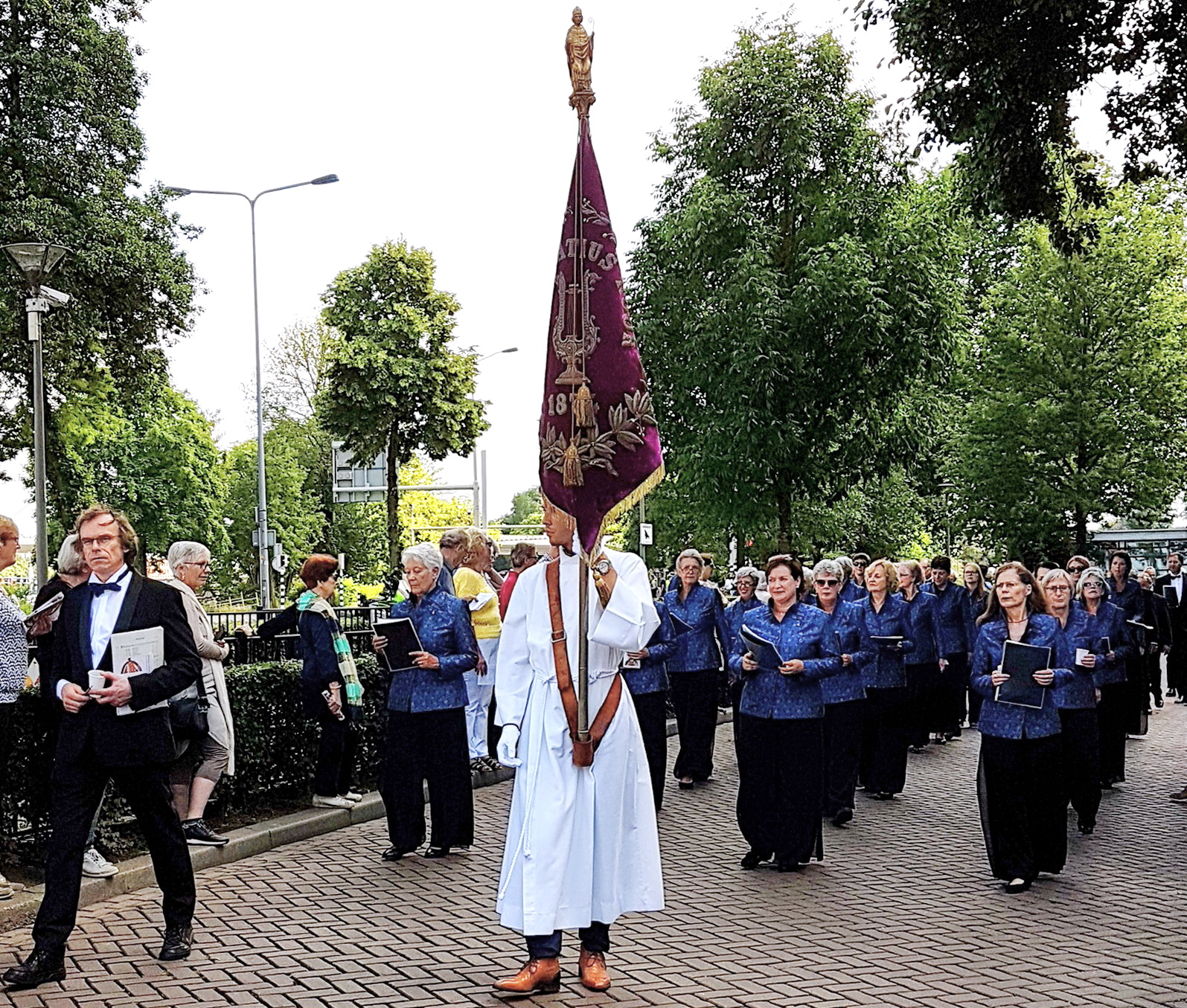
Cappella Sancti Servatii with banner

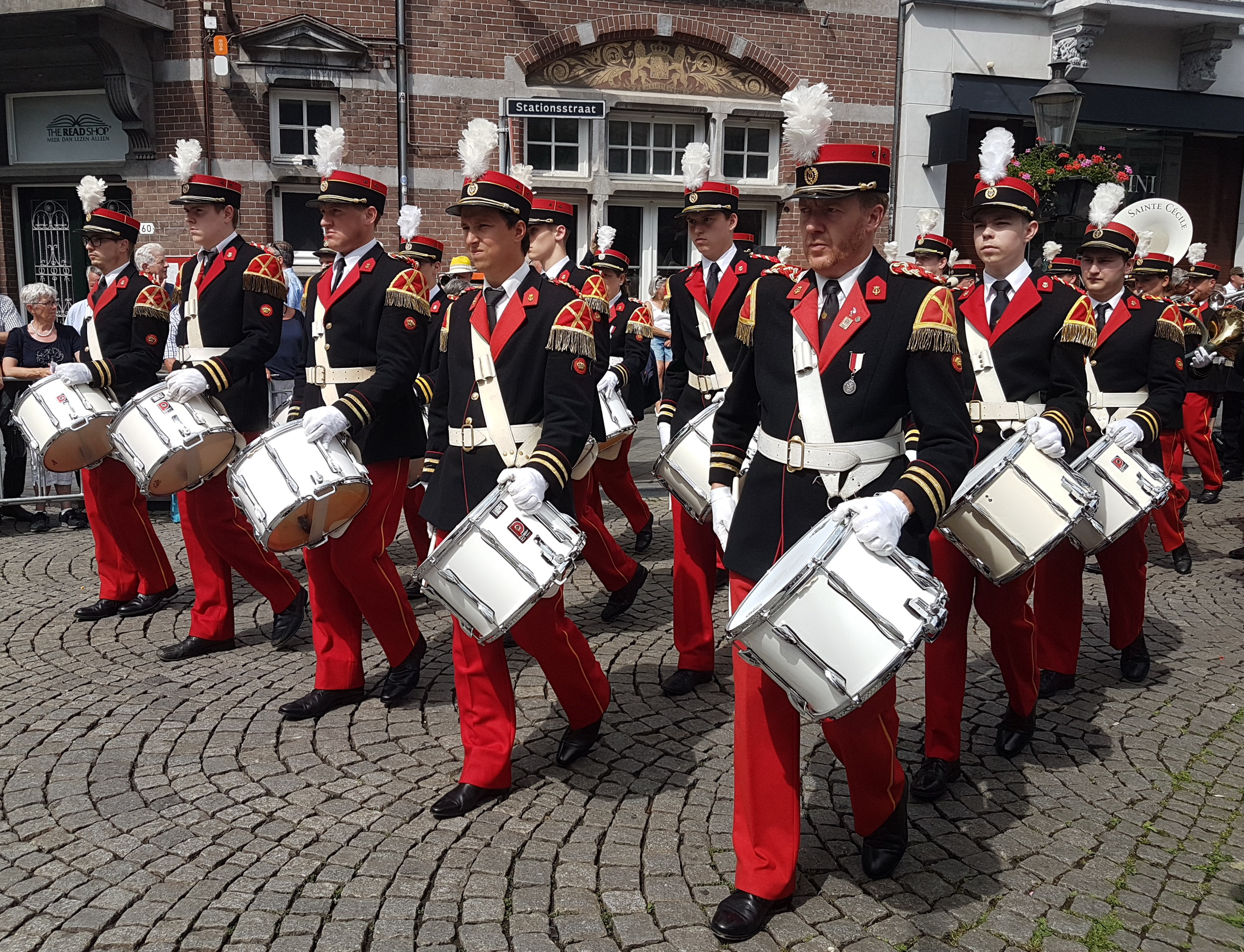
Koninklijke Harmonie Sainte Cécile, Eijsden

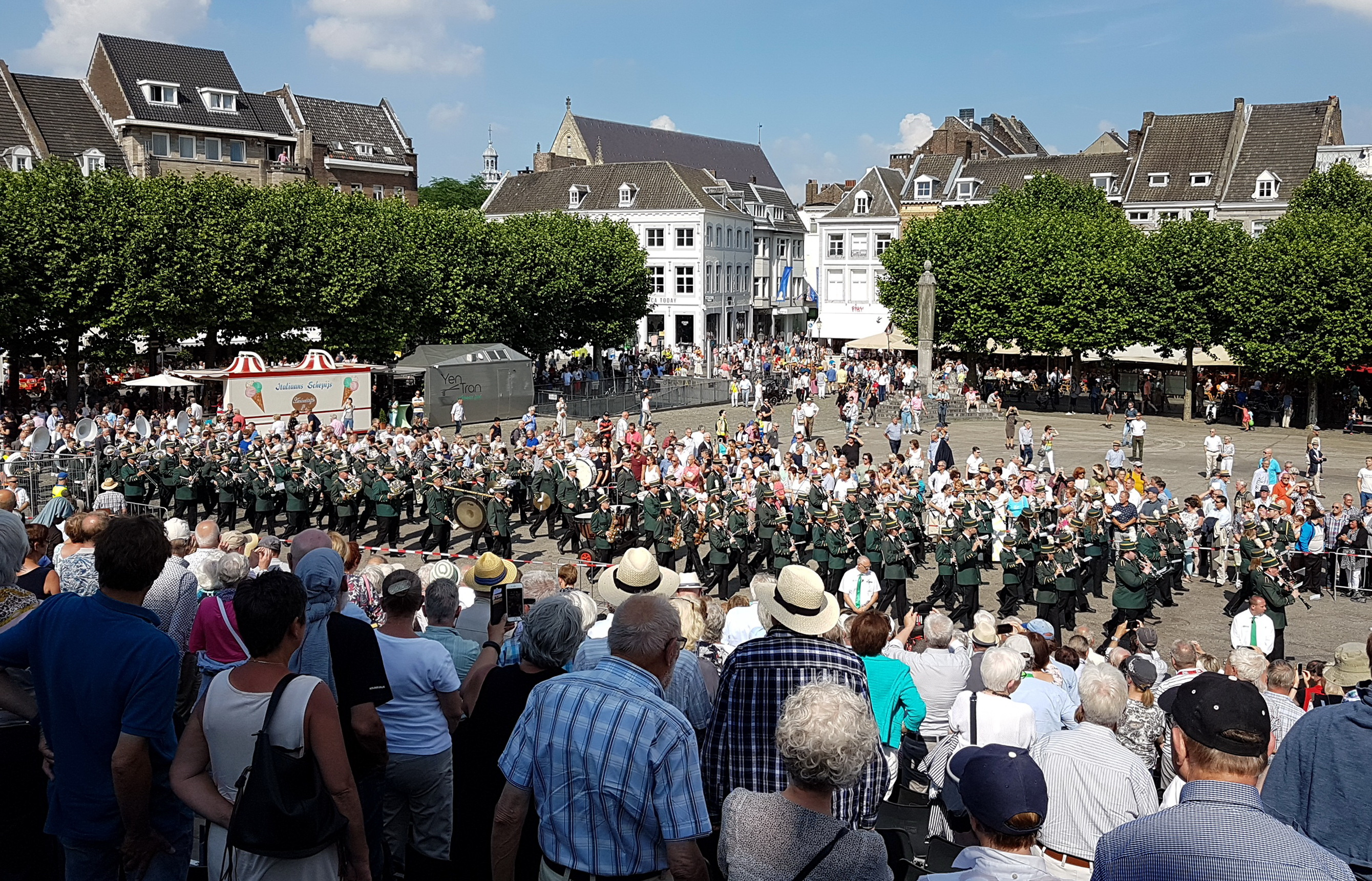
Harmonie Sint Petrus en Paulus, Wolder

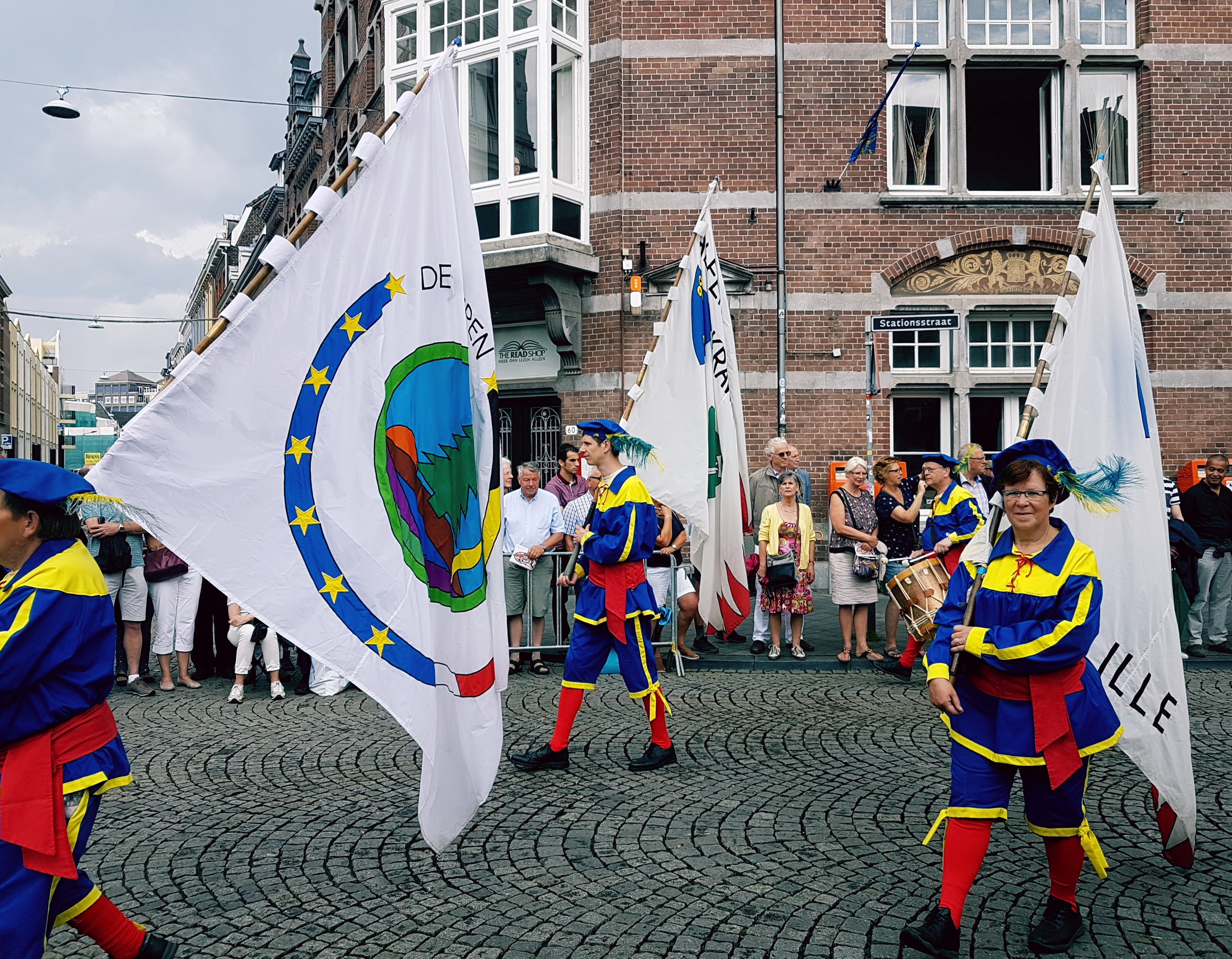
Flag throwers Alfaritax Krawabelli, Lille, France

=== Cultural programme ===
Readings, concerts, theatre performances, film screenings and exhibitions take place at various locations around the city throughout the pilgrimage. Most of these activities are connected to the over-all theme. In 2018 there were plays and concerts in various churches: Saint John's, Saint Lambert's, Saint Theresia's, the Sacred Heart Church (Church of the Dome) as well as the cloisters of St Servatius'. Films were shown in the open air in front of the church of St. Peter-Beneden. Theme exhibitions took place in the cloisters of the basilicas, the east crypt of Our Lady, the Dominican Church, the Centre Céramique cultural centre, the Vrijthof Theatre and the Bonnefantenmuseum. The exhibition Copes in the Bonnefantenmuseum showed historical copes, as well as contemporary designs by local designers of Fashionclash.

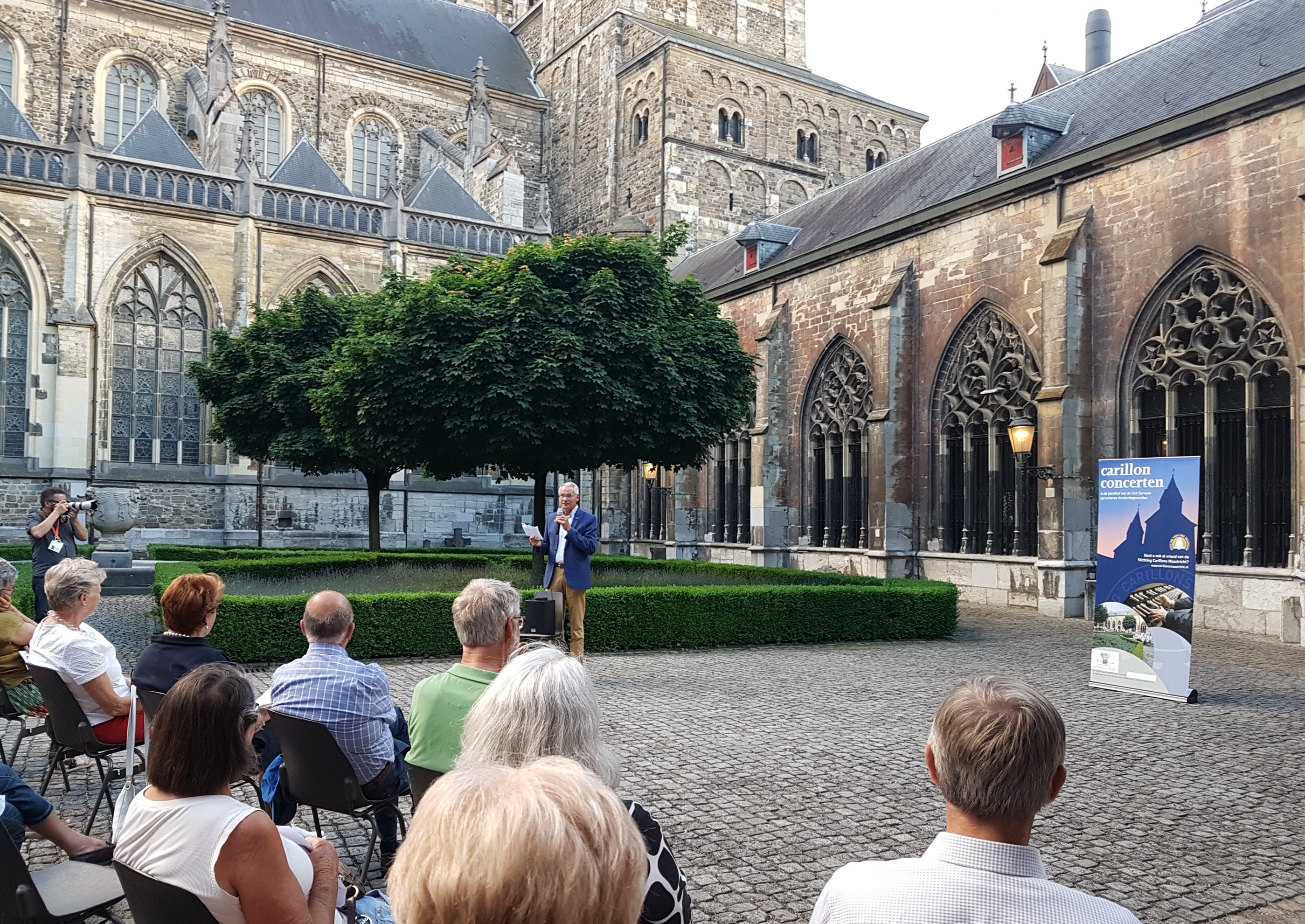
Carillon concert in the cloister yard of St Servatius'

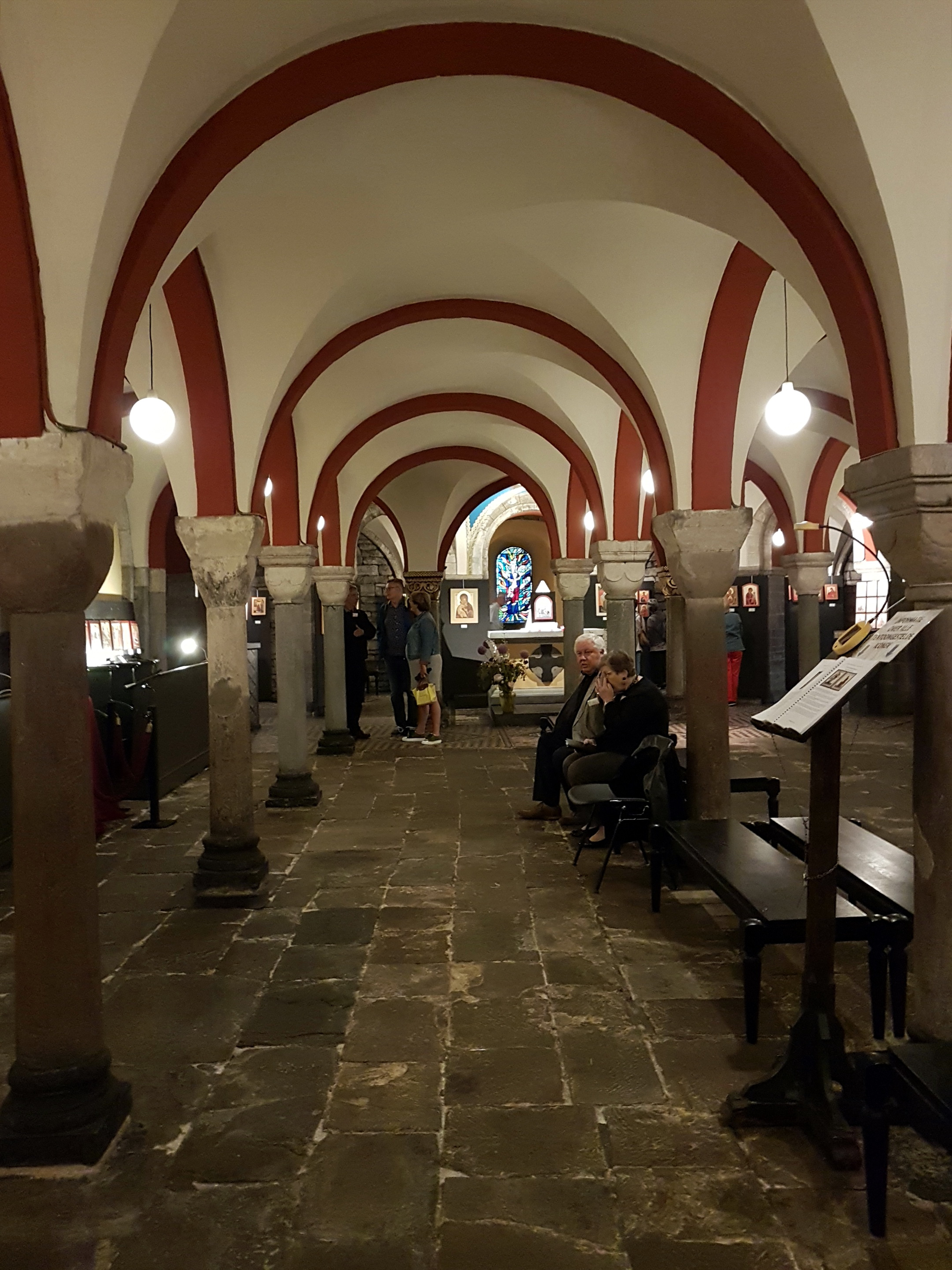
Exhibition of icons in the crypt of Our Lady's

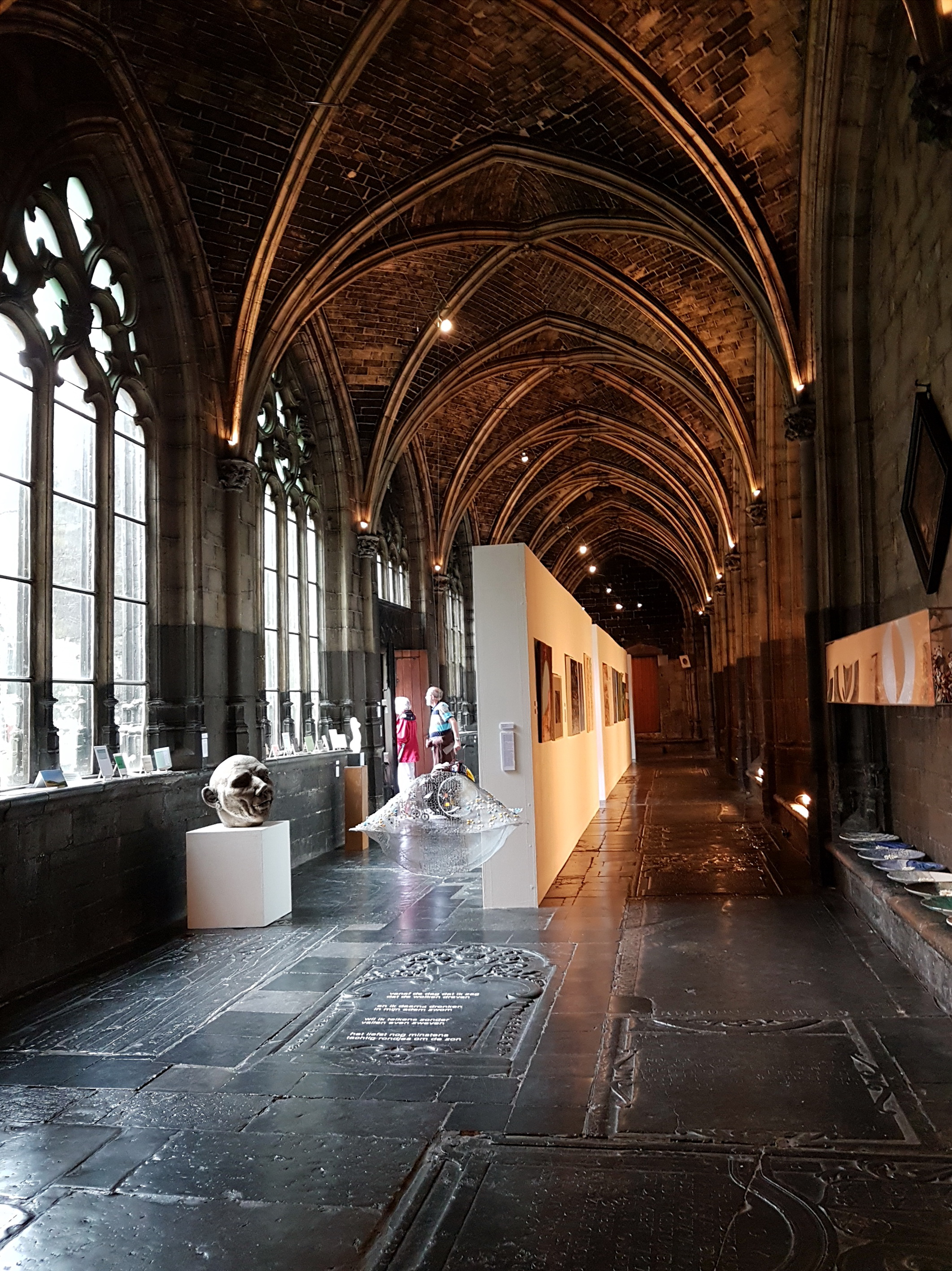
Art exhibition in the cloisters of Our Lady's

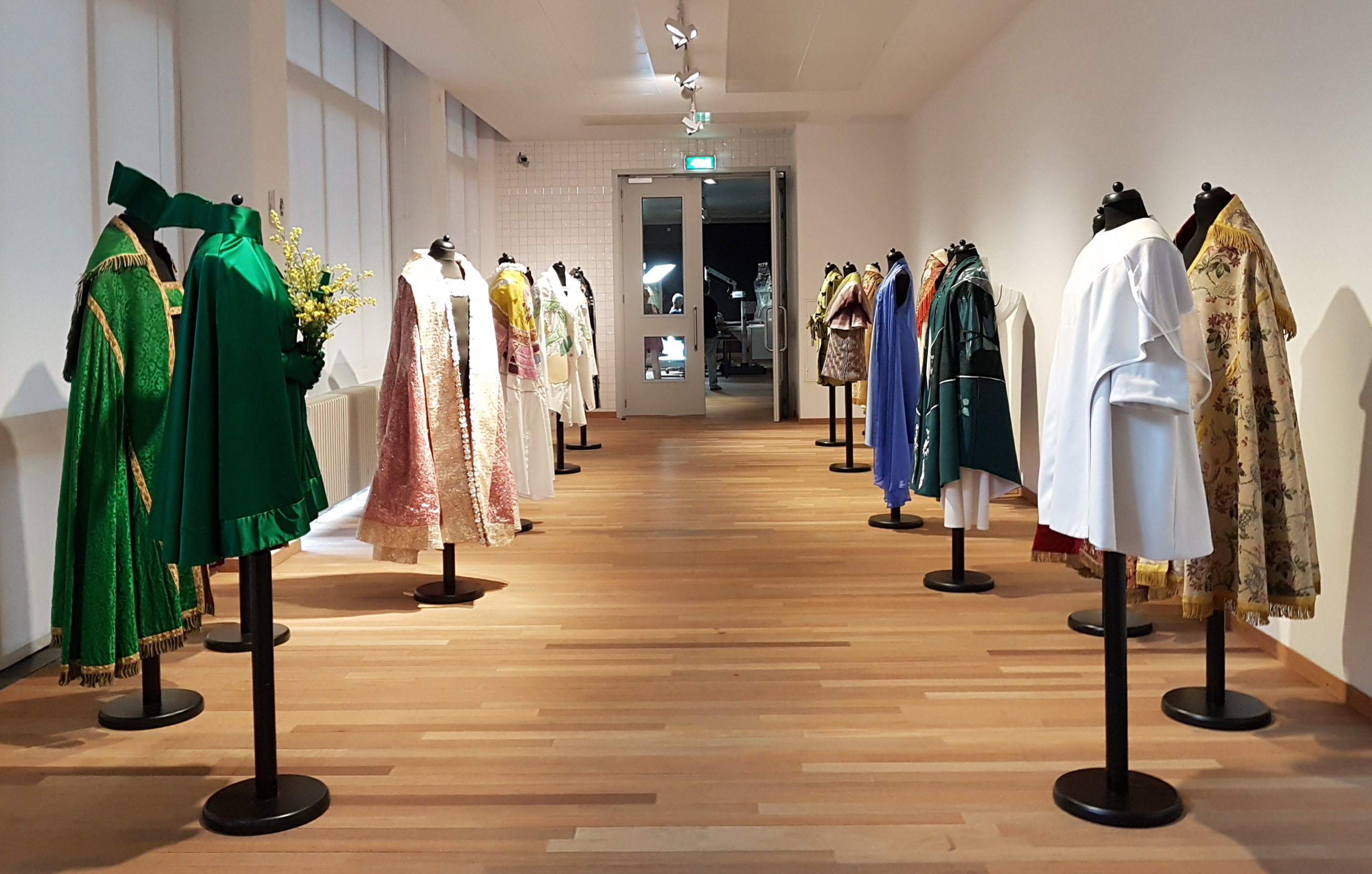
Exhibition of copes, Bonnefantenmuseum

== List of devotional objects in the pilgrimage ==
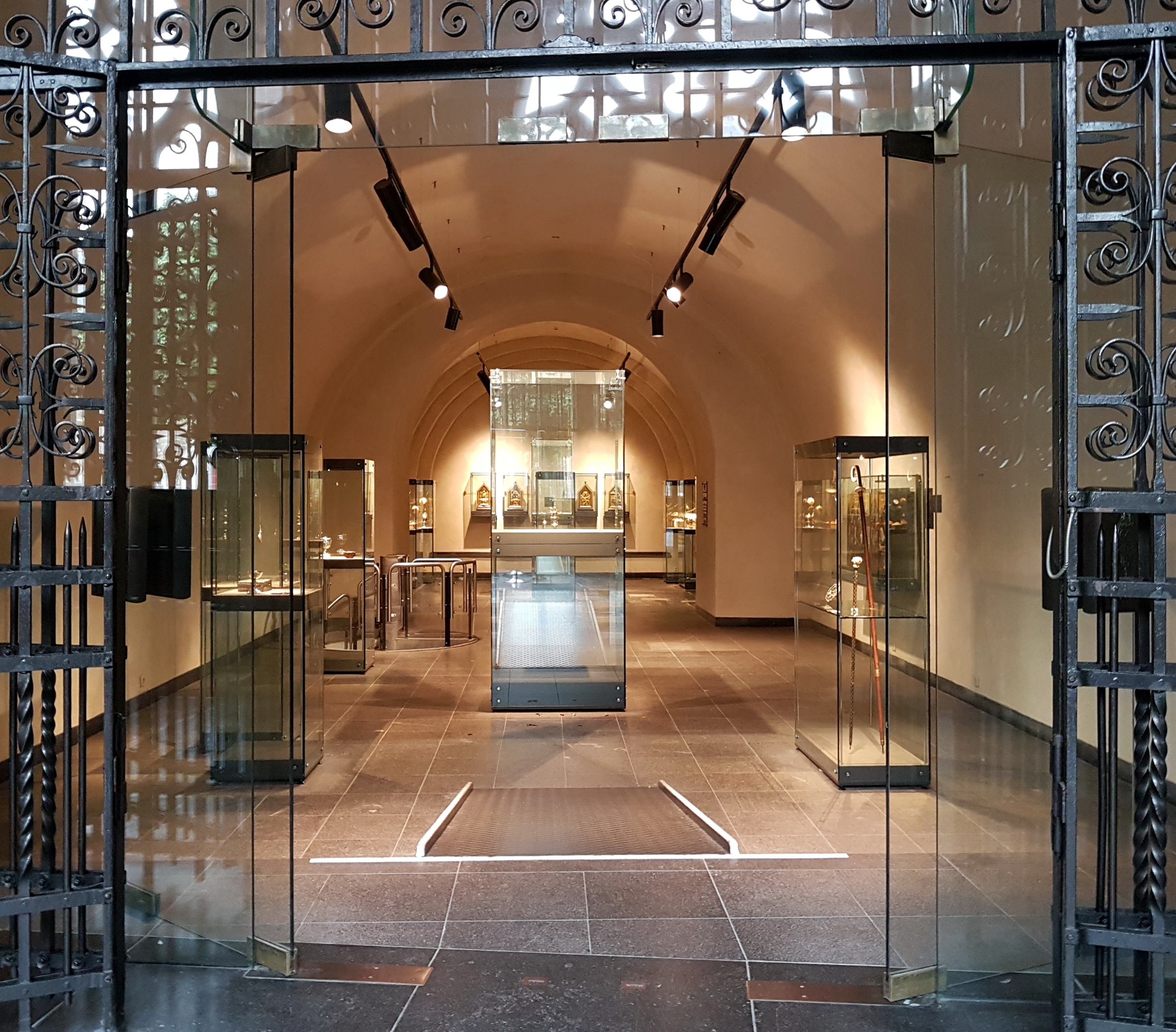
Half-empty showcases in the Treasury of the Basilica of St Servatius during the 2018 pilgrimage

In the septennial pilgrimages a range of devotional objects take centre stage, foremost the relics of Saint Servatius. Some objects are very old and are part of the local or national patrimony. Not every relic, reliquary or statue of a saint is shown during the Heiligdomsvaart pilgrimage. There are hundreds of objects in the treasuries of the main churches, which requires selection. For conservational reasons some fragile objects that traditionally have been part of the pilgrimage are no longer shown.

=== Servatiana ===
Since the earliest records the so-called 'Servatiana' have played a pivotal role in the Maastricht pilgrimage. These are objects believed to be the personal belongings of Saint Servatius. In the septennial pilgrimage they were shown from the dwarf gallery. Some of the Servatiana were lost over time. Remaining in the treasury are: the key of Saint Servatius, the pectoral cross of Saint Servatius, his seal, his cup, his pilgrim's staff, his crozier, his chalice, his paten and his portable altar. Due to their size and frailty their role has diminished in recent years. An additional reason for this could be that art historians have argued that, with the exception of the cup of Saint Servatius, none of these objects are old enough to have been the personal belongings of someone who lived in the 4th century. These days only the key and the pectoral cross are shown during the relics display in the church; none of the Servatiana are included in the processions. A copy of the pilgrim's staff is on permanent display in the small crypt which gives access to the grave of Saint Servatius.

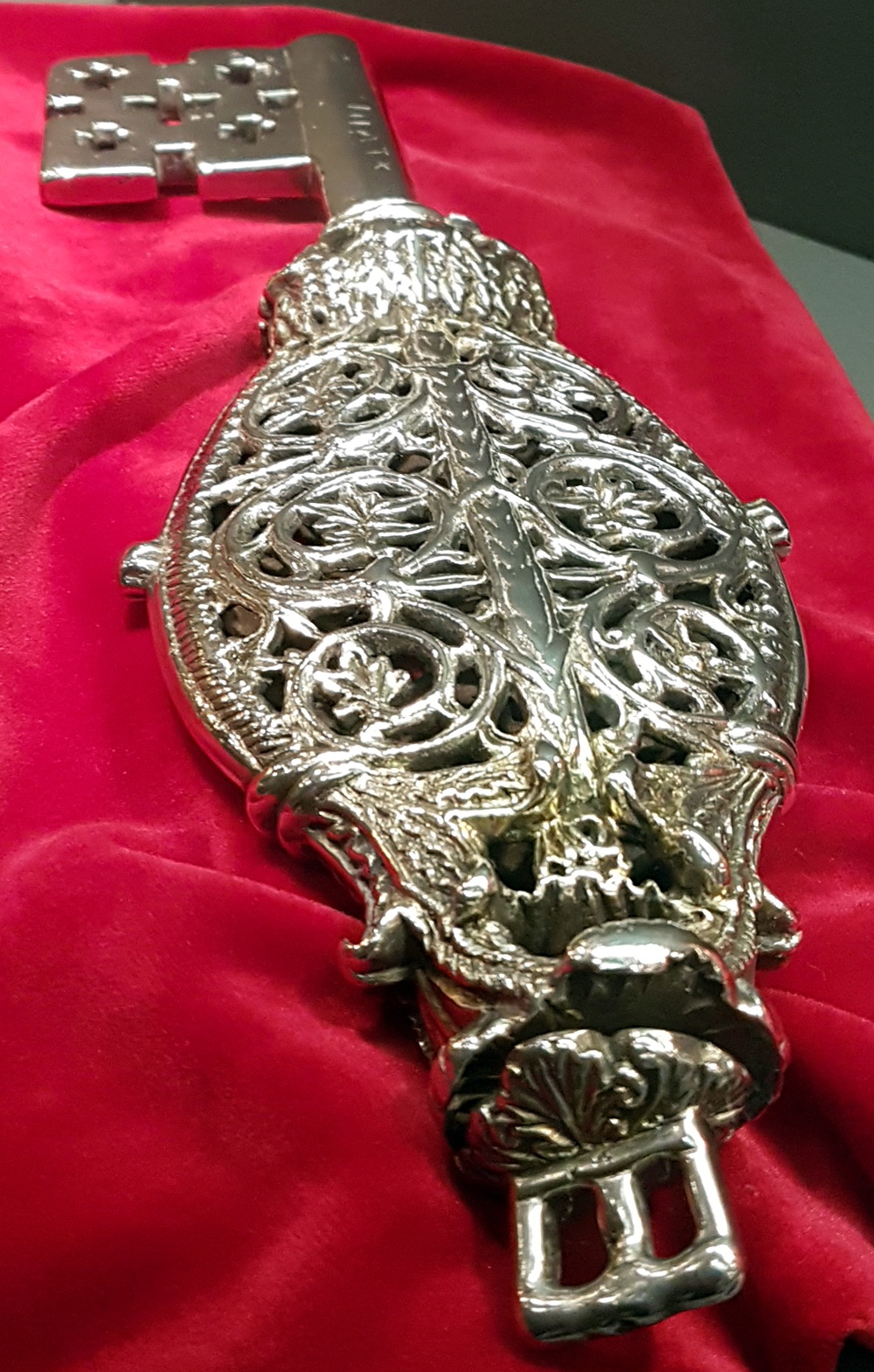
Key of Saint Servatius

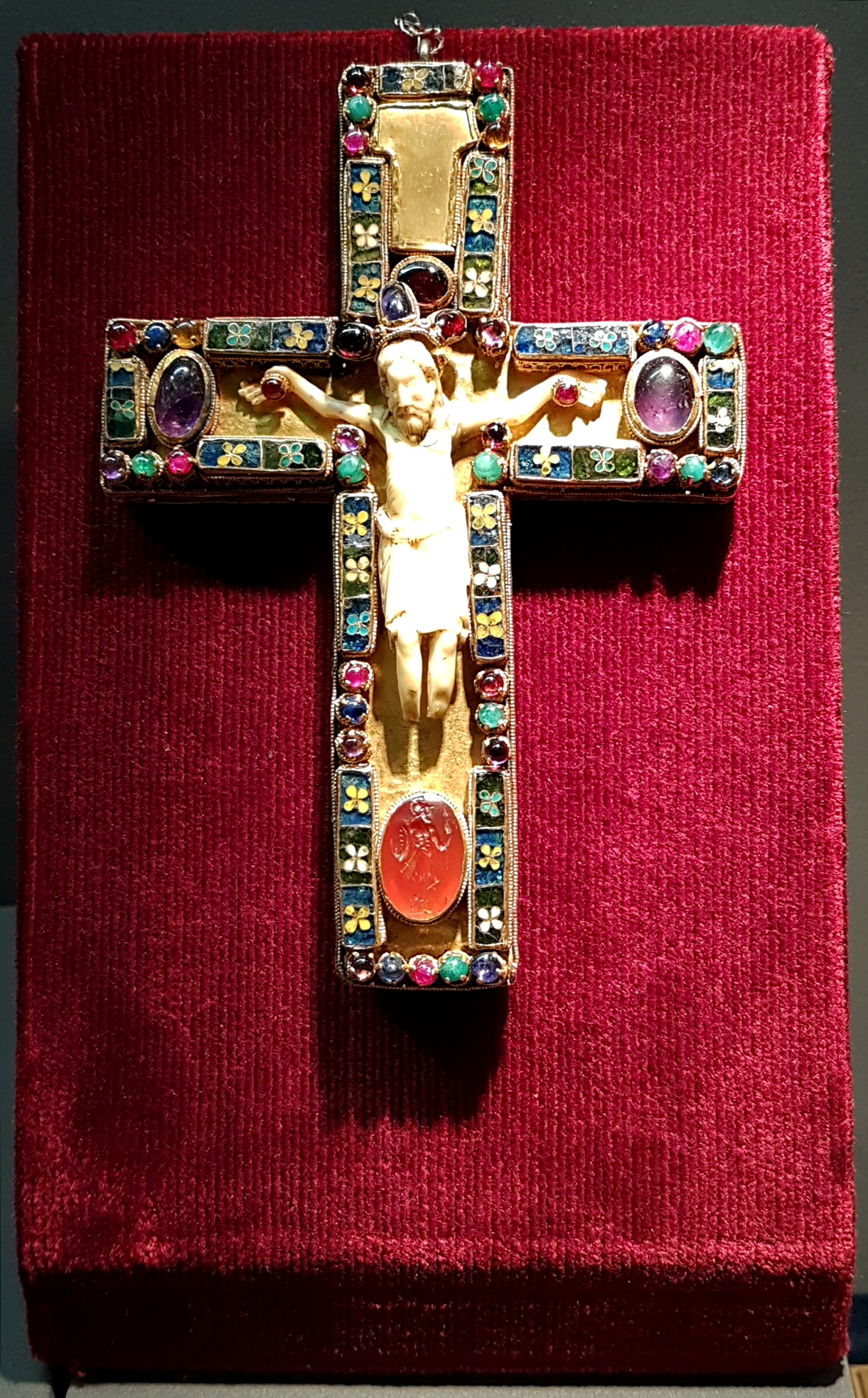
Pectoral cross of Saint Servatius

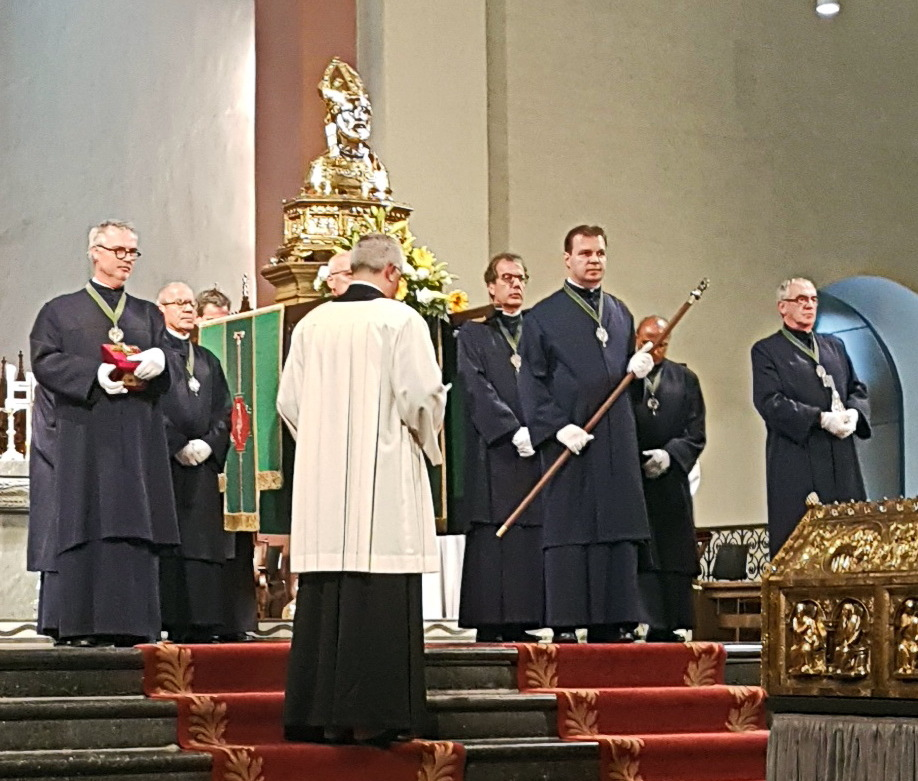
Showing of the bust, key and pectoral cross

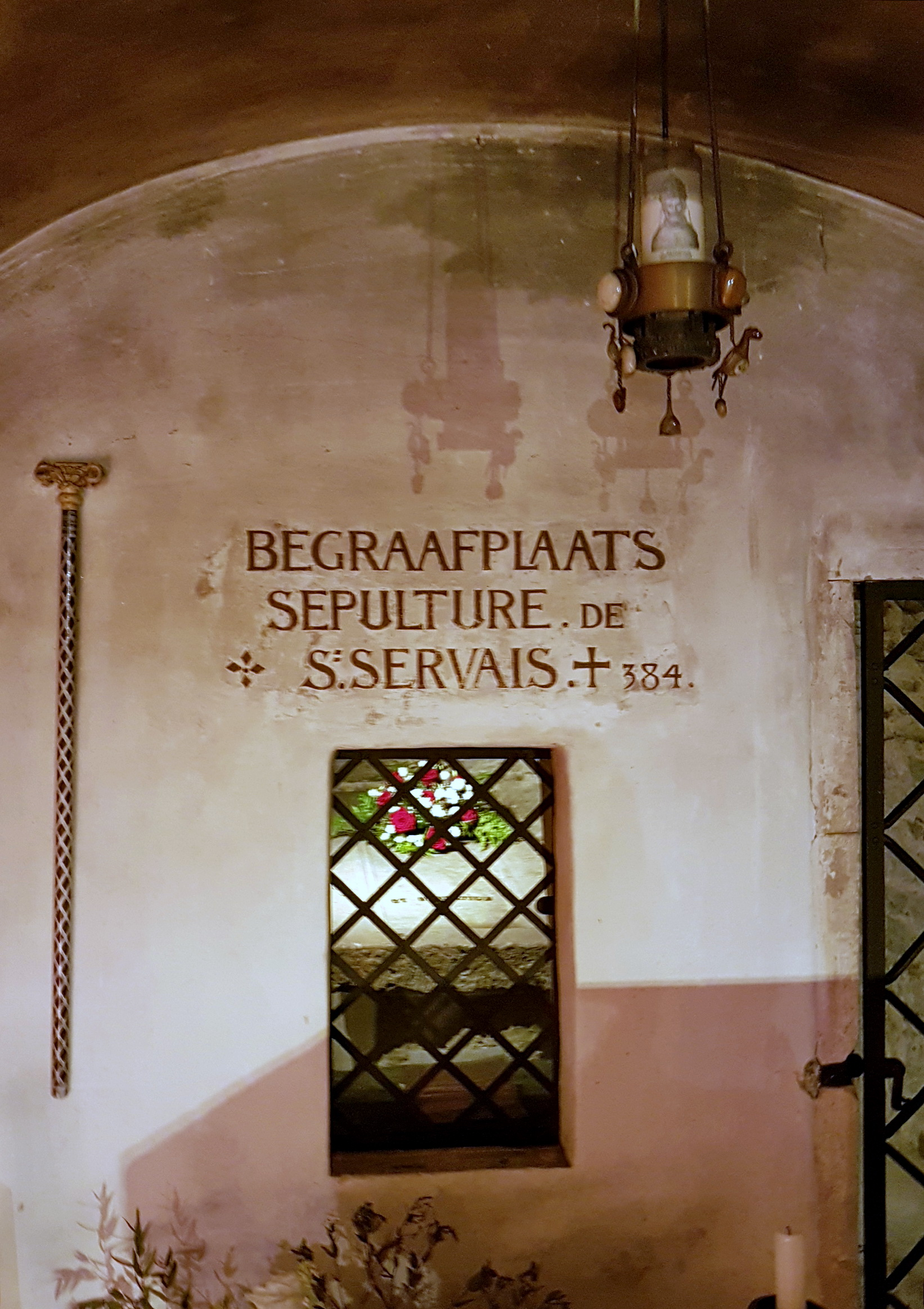
Copy of the pilgrim's staff in the small crypt

=== Maastricht Devotions ===
The four major devotional statues in Maastricht, locally known at the City or Municipal Devotions (Dutch: stadsdevoties), are religious objects that have been venerated in Maastricht for a long time. They are: the statue of Our Lady, Star of the Sea, the Black Christ of Wyck, the bust of Saint Servatius and the bust of Saint Lambert. During the Maastricht pilgrimage they take part in processions and various other religious activities.

==== Star of the Sea ====
The statue of Our Lady, Star of the Sea (usually referred to as: the Star of the Sea) is probably the best known and most popular of the Maastricht devotions. It is a 15th-century statue of Mary with the baby child Jesus in the style of the German schöne Madonnen. It has a long tradition of being included in processions, first with the Maastricht Minorites, after 1837 with the parish of Our Lady. Even now it participates in around ten processions each year. For the shorter processions a small processional litter is used that requires four carriers. For the longer processions, as in the septennial pilgrimage, a much larger steel structure is used. Twelve carriers are required to take this litter on their shoulders. The larger structure is covered in white damask and decorated with flowers. The carriers are members of the Carriers Guild of the Star of the Sea (Dutch: Dragersgilde Sterre der Zee). The guild members wear tunics, some dark-blue and red, others light-blue and white, decorated with guild medals. They all wear white gloves. At regular intervals one team of carriers replaces the other. Members of the Confraternity of the Star of the Sea (Dutch: Broederschap Sterre der Zee) escort the processional litter, wearing white tie and a black cloak with a six-pointed star on it. Some carry processional lanterns or processional poles with fraternity plaques. The statue of the Star of the Sea has no role in the relics display in the church, although this ceremony is traditionally concluded by the hymn O Star of the Sea.

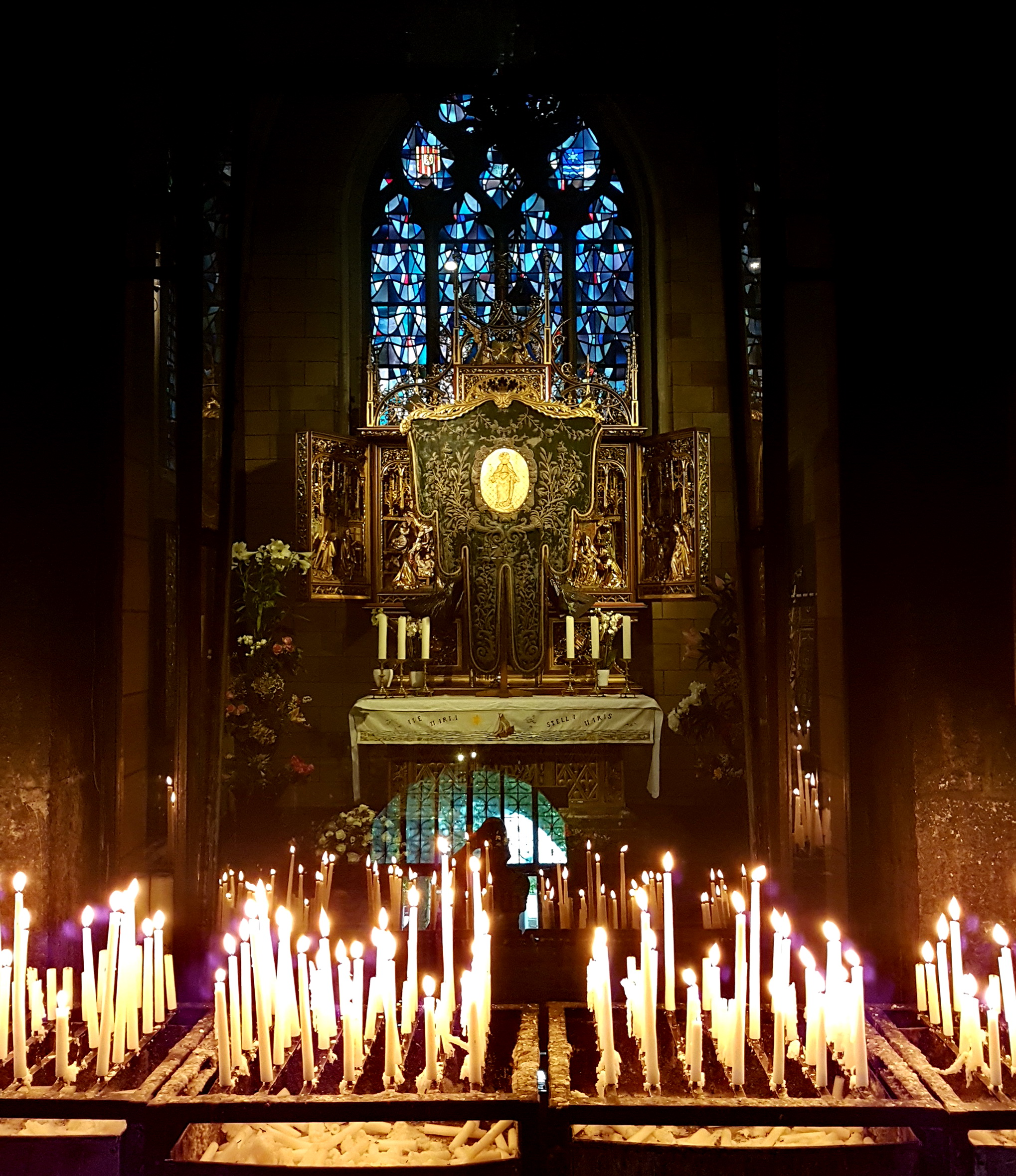
'Empty' Star of the Sea Chapel during the procession

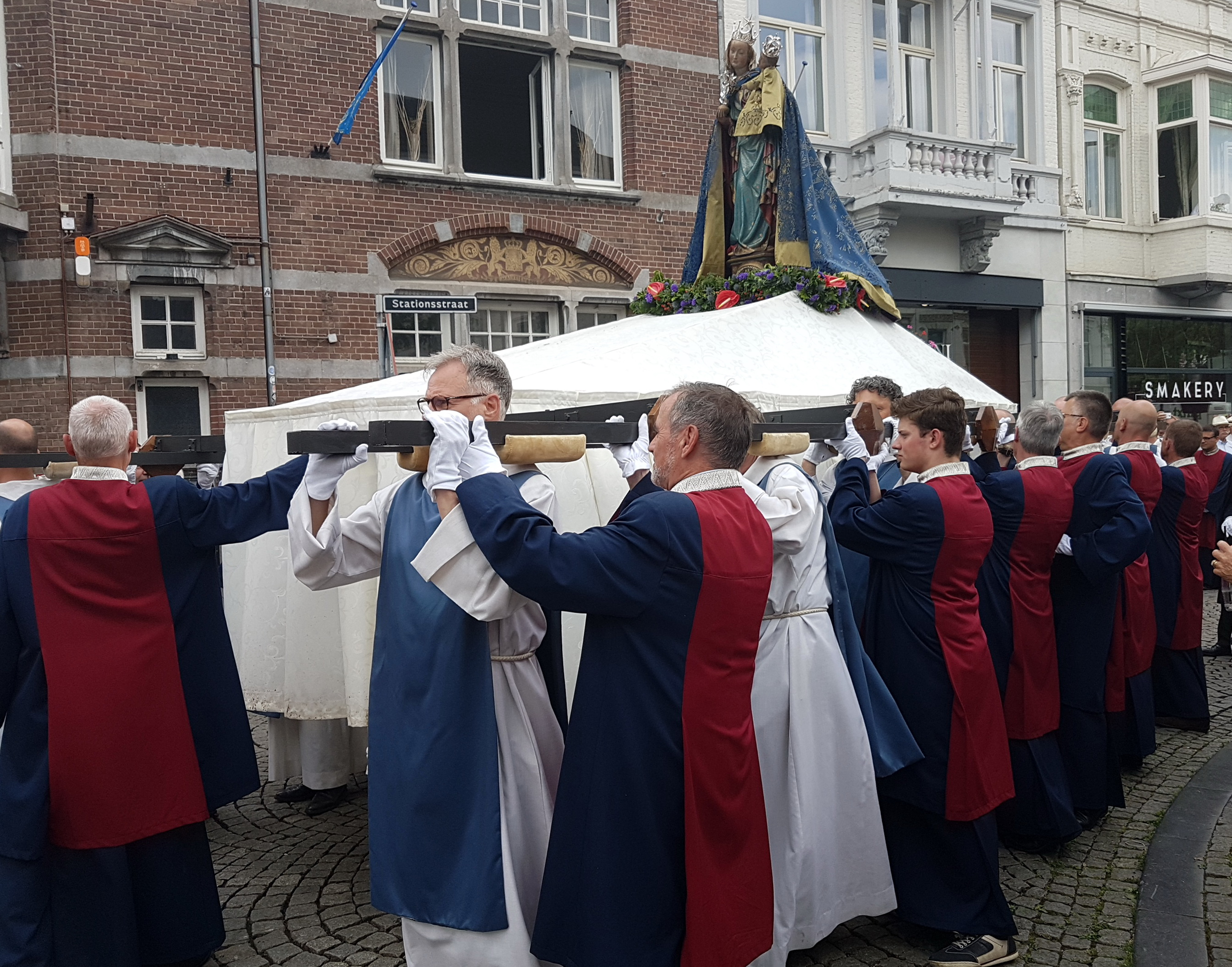
Replacement of carriers in Stationsstraat

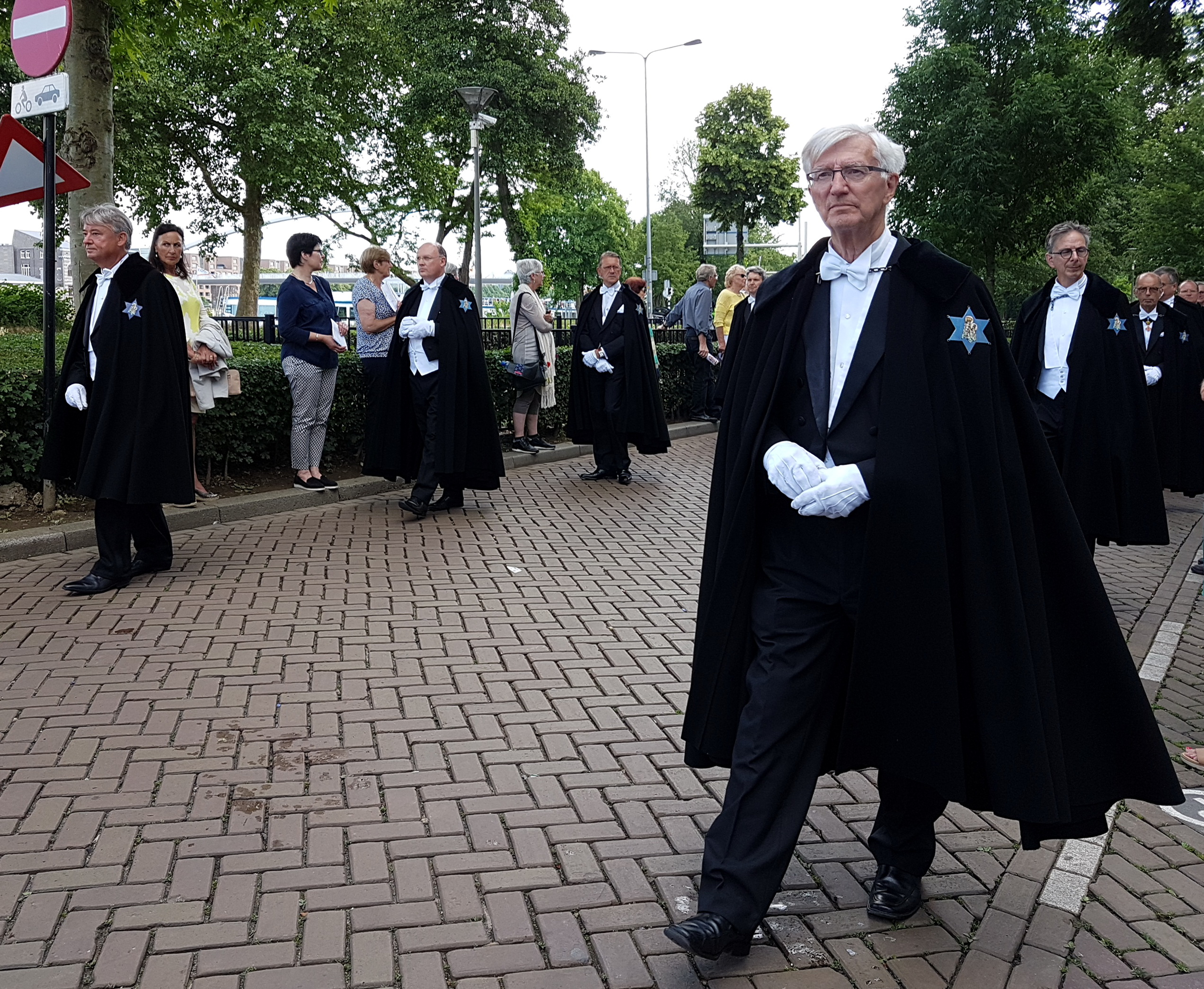
Confraternity of the Star of the Sea at Het Bat

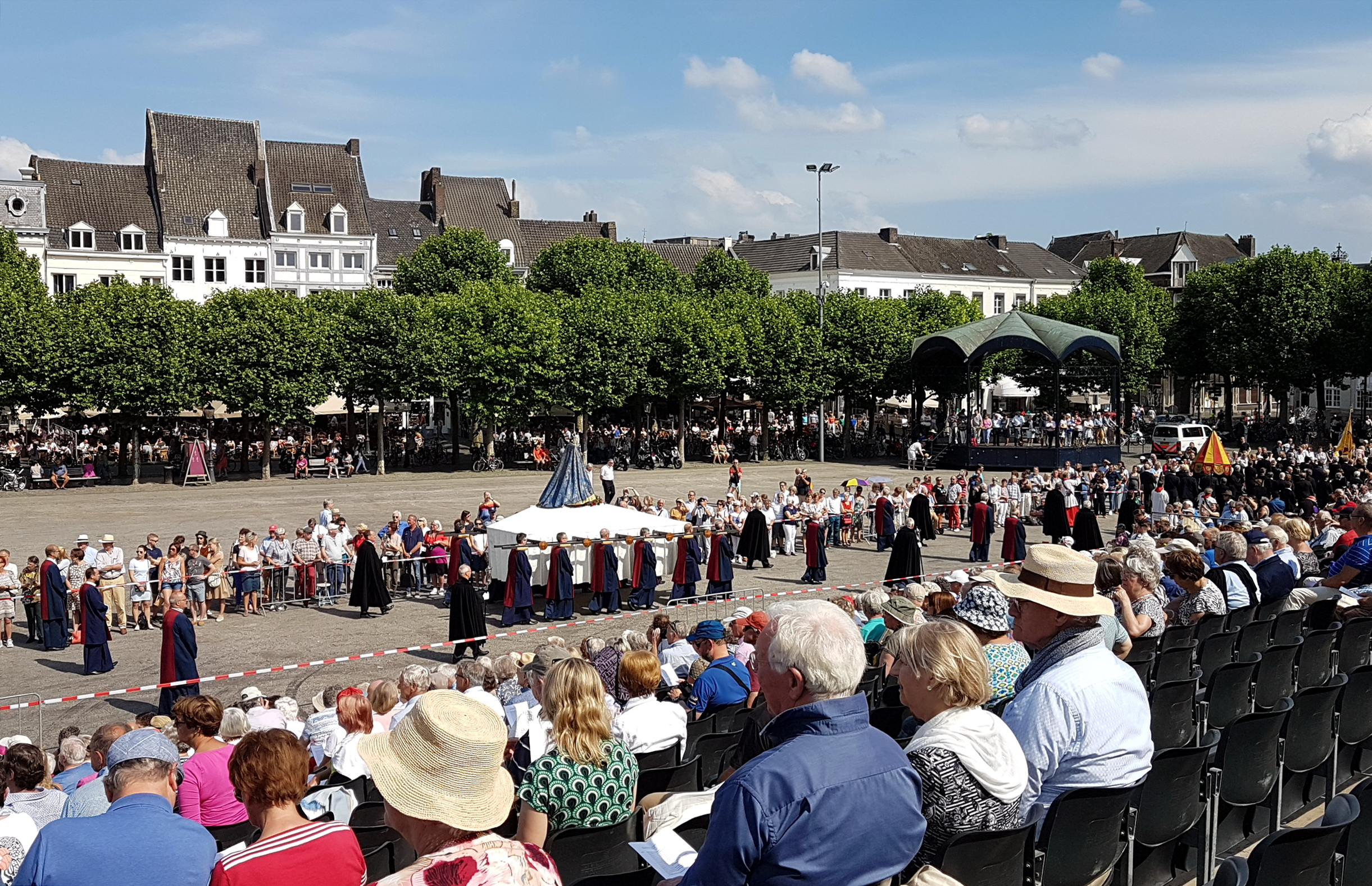
Star of the Sea in procession in Vrijthof

==== Black Christ of Wyck ====
The 'Black Christ of Wyck' is a large 13th-century corpus of dark walnut that was once part of a crucifix. For centuries it was kept in the monastery of the White Nuns (Dutch: Wittevrouwenklooster) in Vrijthof, where it attracted pilgrims mainly from Central Europe. After the dissolution of the monasteries the statue was given to the parish church of St Martin in Wyck. In 1813 the Confraternity of the Holy Cross (Dutch: Broederschap van het Heilig Kruis) was founded, which in 1963 had around 2,000 members. Members of the confraternity carry the Black Christ in processions on a large processional litter similar to the one used for the Star of the Sea. Their tunics are red and black, matching their processional banner.

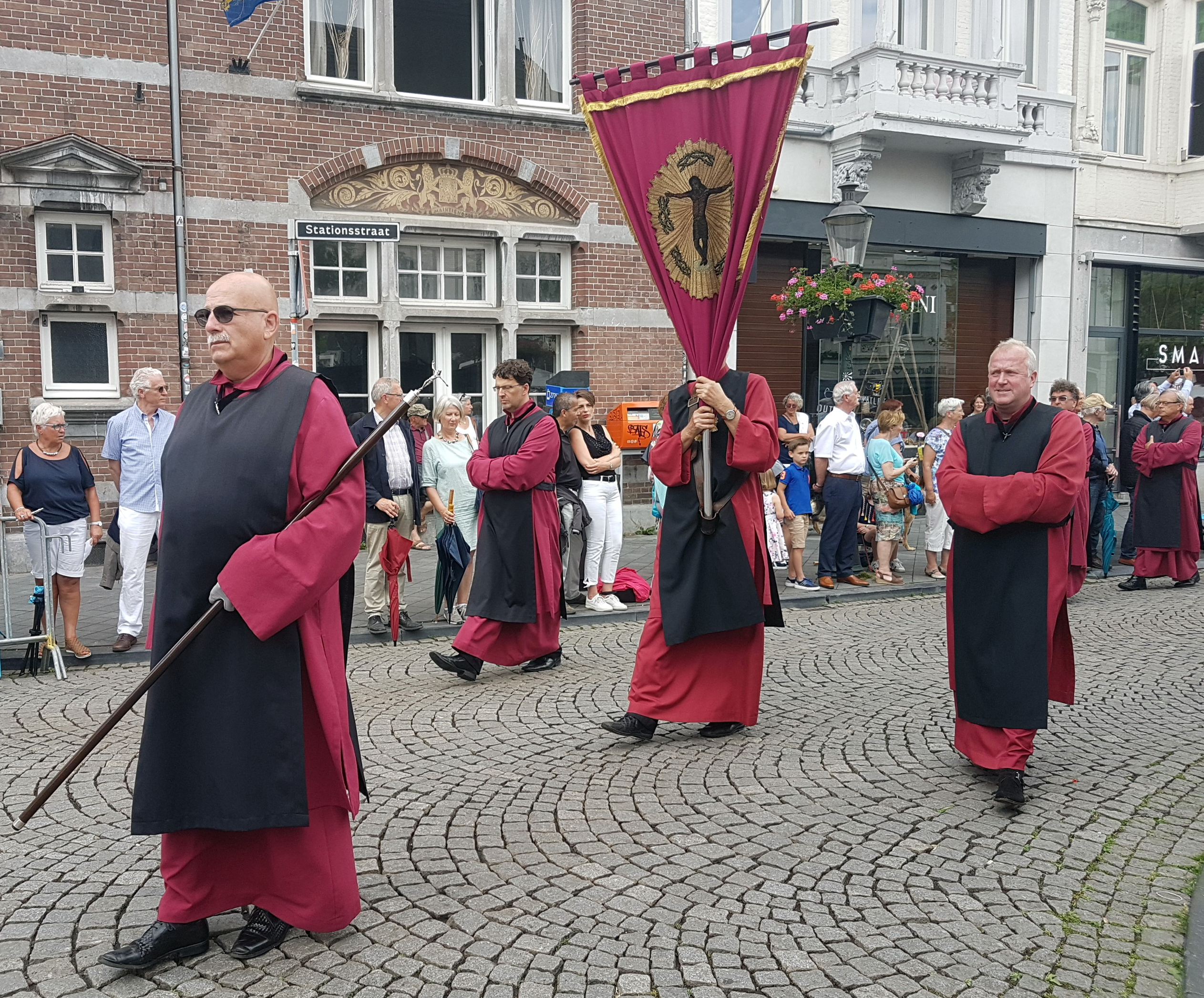
Confraternity of the Holy Cross with banner

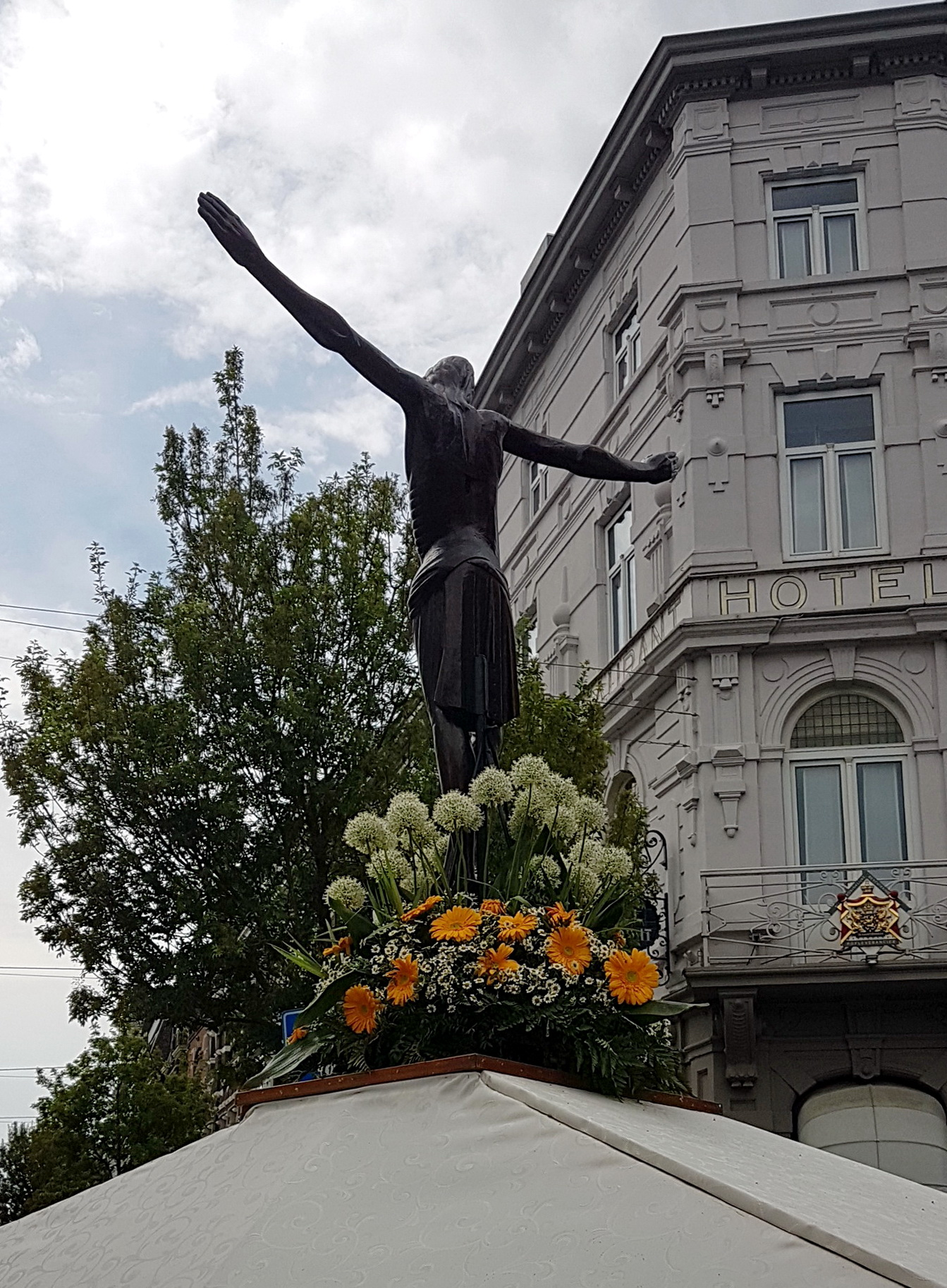
Close-up of the Black Christ in Wyck

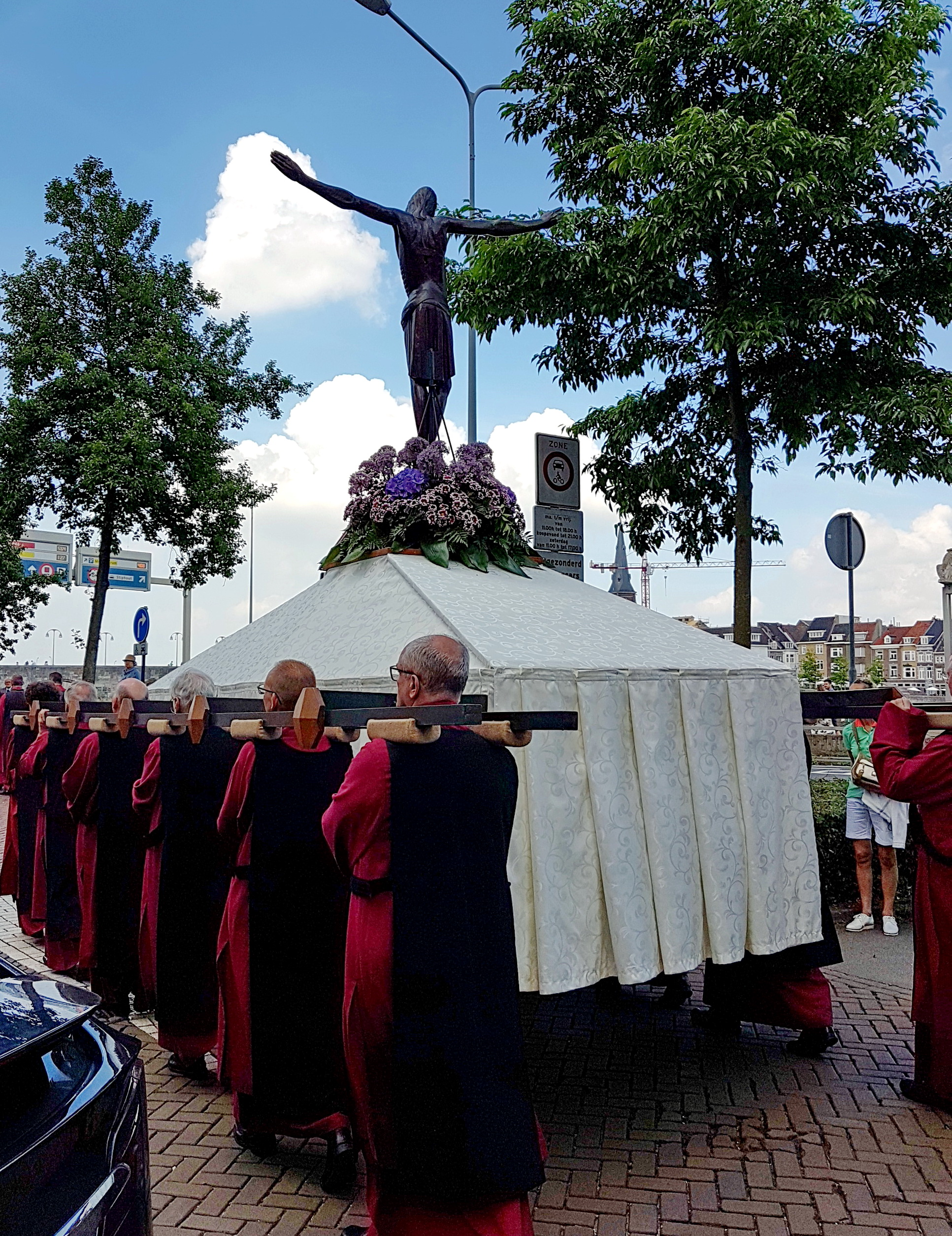
Confraternity and Black Christ in Het Bat

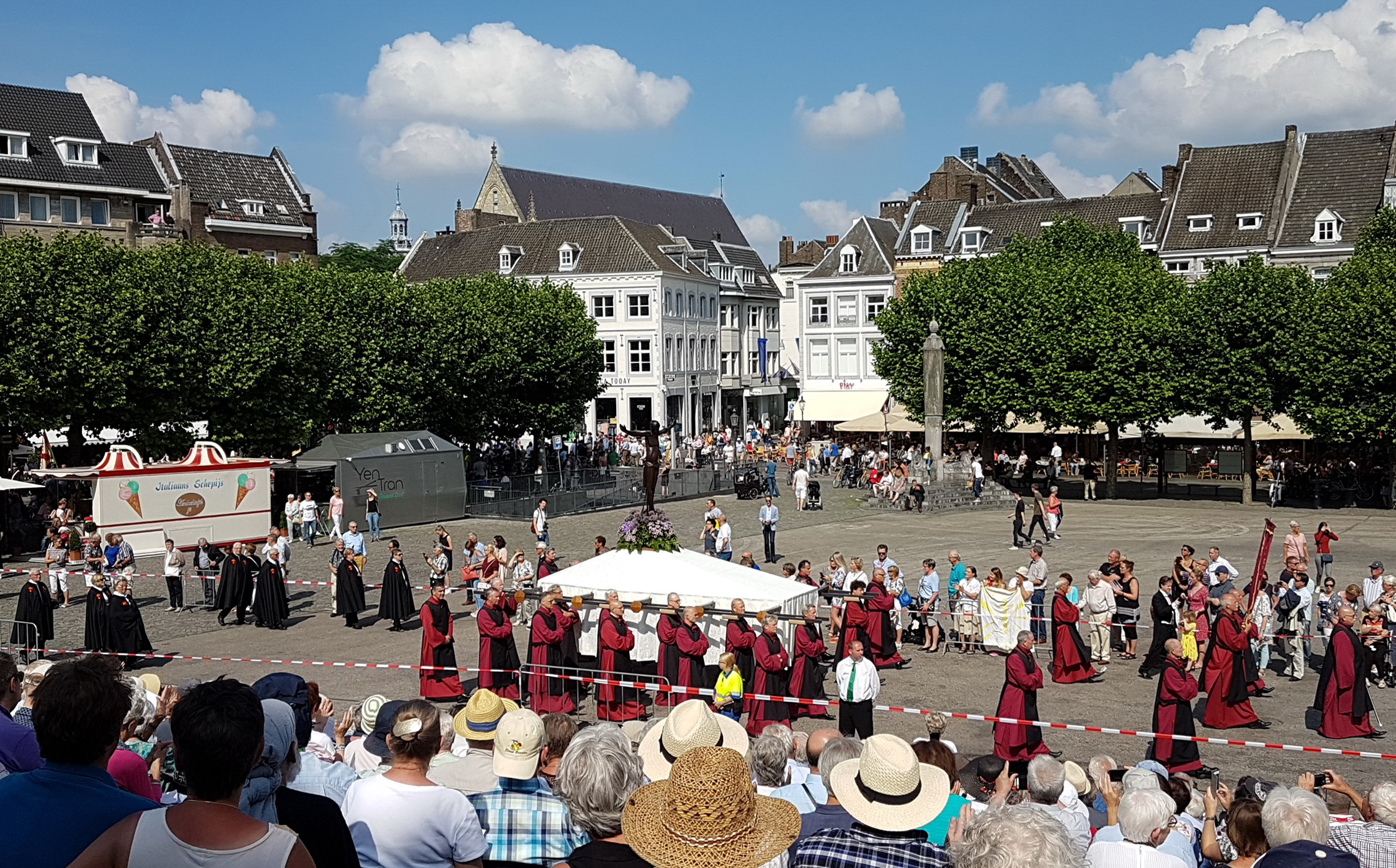
Confraternity and Black Christ in Vrijthof

==== Bust of Saint Servatius ====
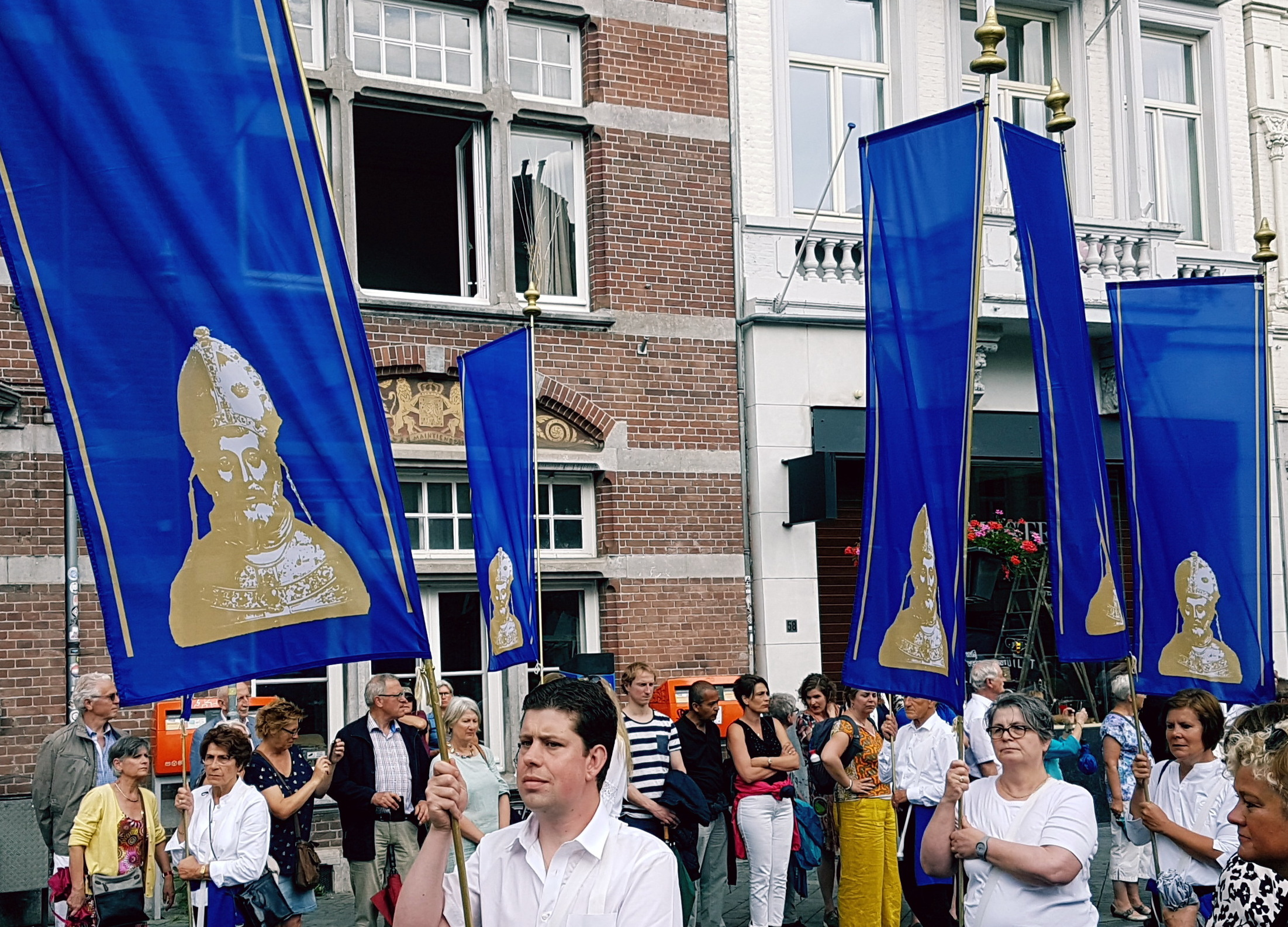
Banners showing the bust of Saint Servatius

The reliquary bust of Saint Servatius as we know it presumably is the second or third bust of Maastricht's patron saint. A previous bust dating back to around 1400 was shown from the dwarf gallery to pilgrims in Vrijthof square. It was largely destroyed during the Siege of 1579. The new bust was commissioned by the besieger, Alexander Farnese, Duke of Parma, whose coat of arms is on the pedestal. The silver-coated and partly gilded bust is a major artistic work in the Treasury of Saint Servatius. It contains a large fragment of the skull of the saint. The bust is also a cultural icon of the Maastricht pilgrimage. Images of the bust appear on flags, banners and printed material. The bust takes central stage at the opening ceremony of the pilgrimage (see: 'Programme/Masses and other services'). Until the 1970s, the brothers of the Beyart Monastery (Brothers of the Immaculate Conception of Mary, or Brothers of Maastricht) carried the bust in processions; since 1976 members of the Saint Servatius Guild have taken that task (literally) upon their shoulders. Members of the guild wear two-part dark blue tunics, white gloves and a green ribbon around their neck with a guild medal. As is the case with the Star of the Sea statue, two processional litters are used, one for short or indoor processions, the other one for longer trips. A plastic slip-over is used to protect the bust in bad weather.

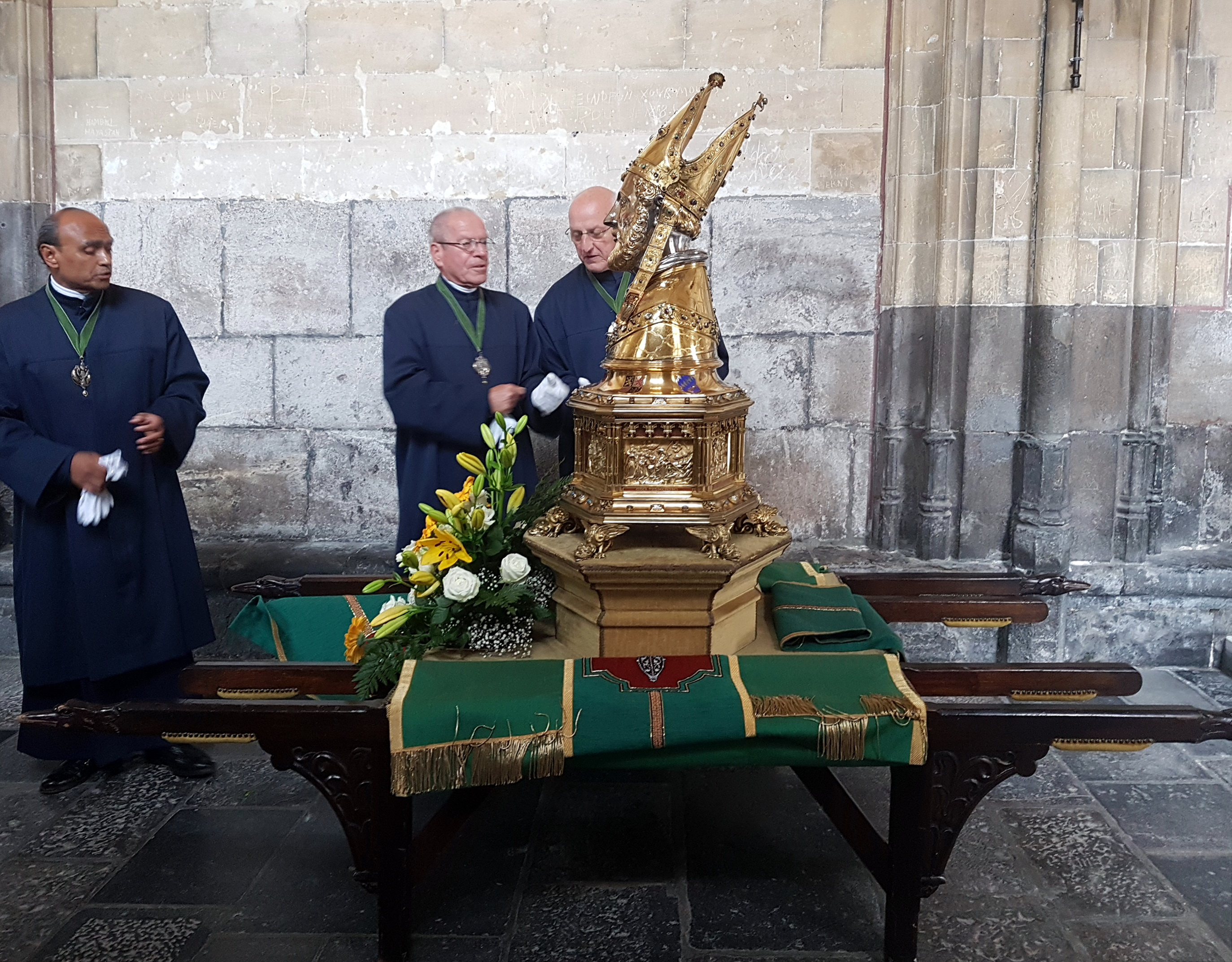
Before the relics display in St Servatius'

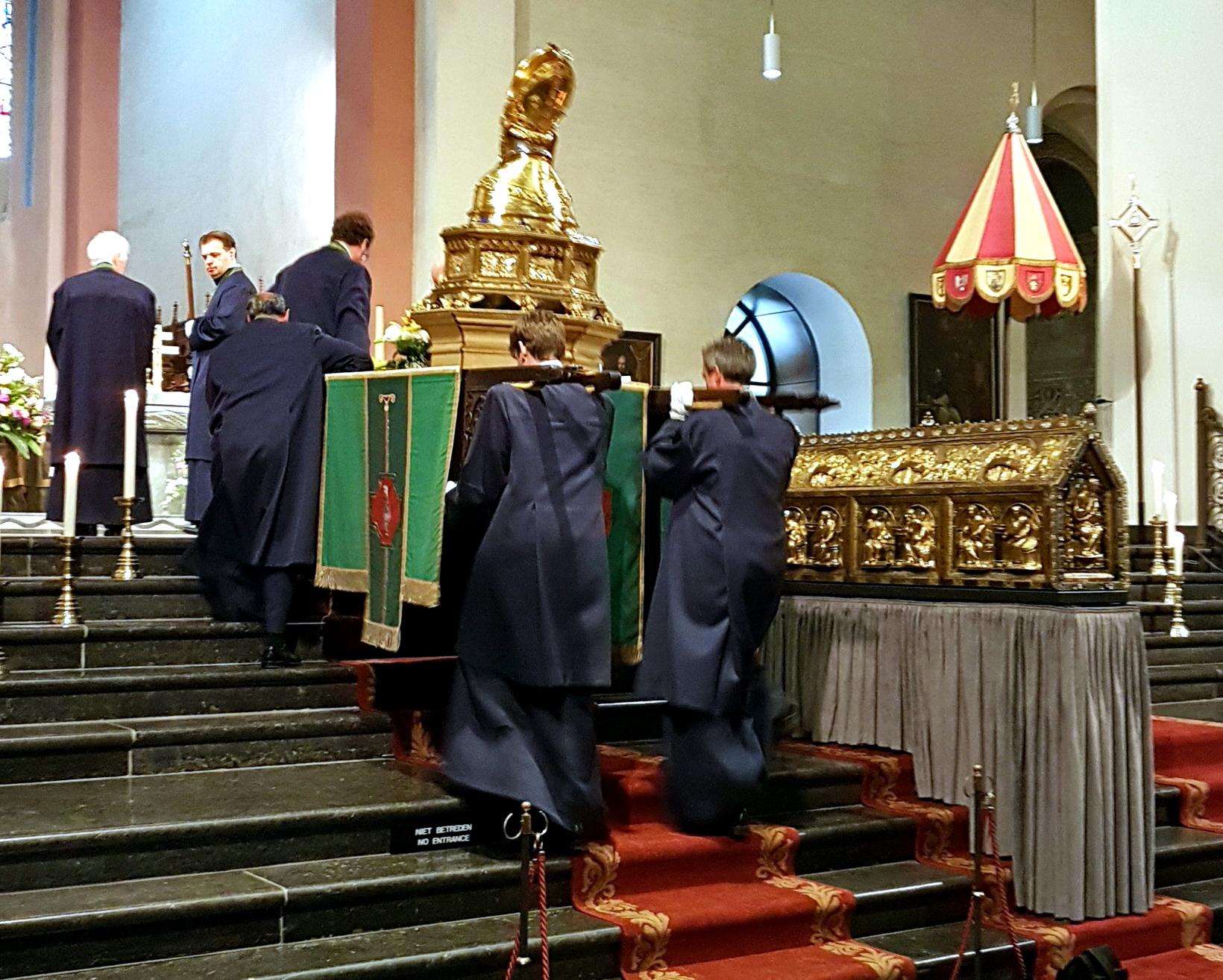
The small processional litter going up the choir stairs

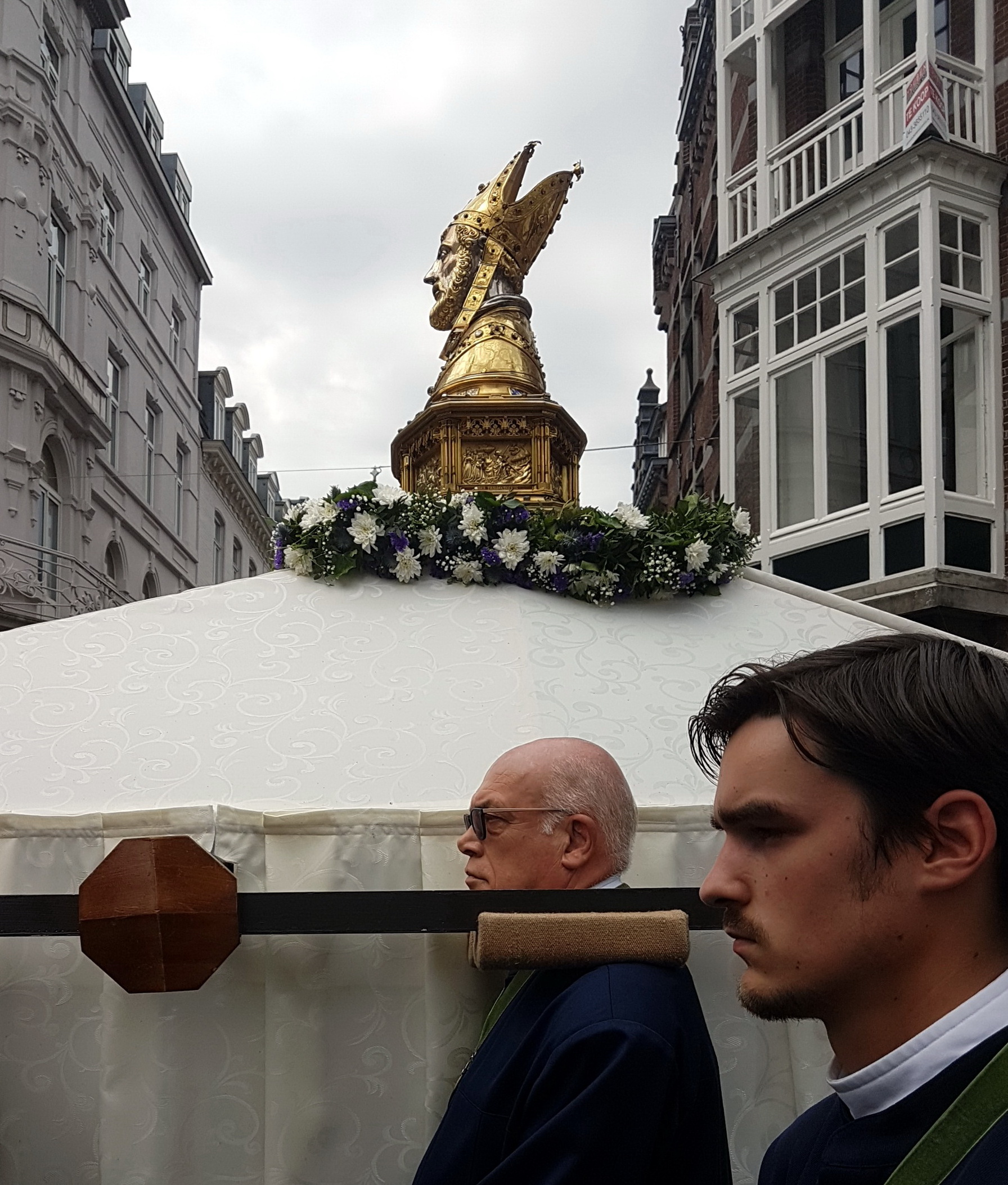
The big processional litter in Wyck

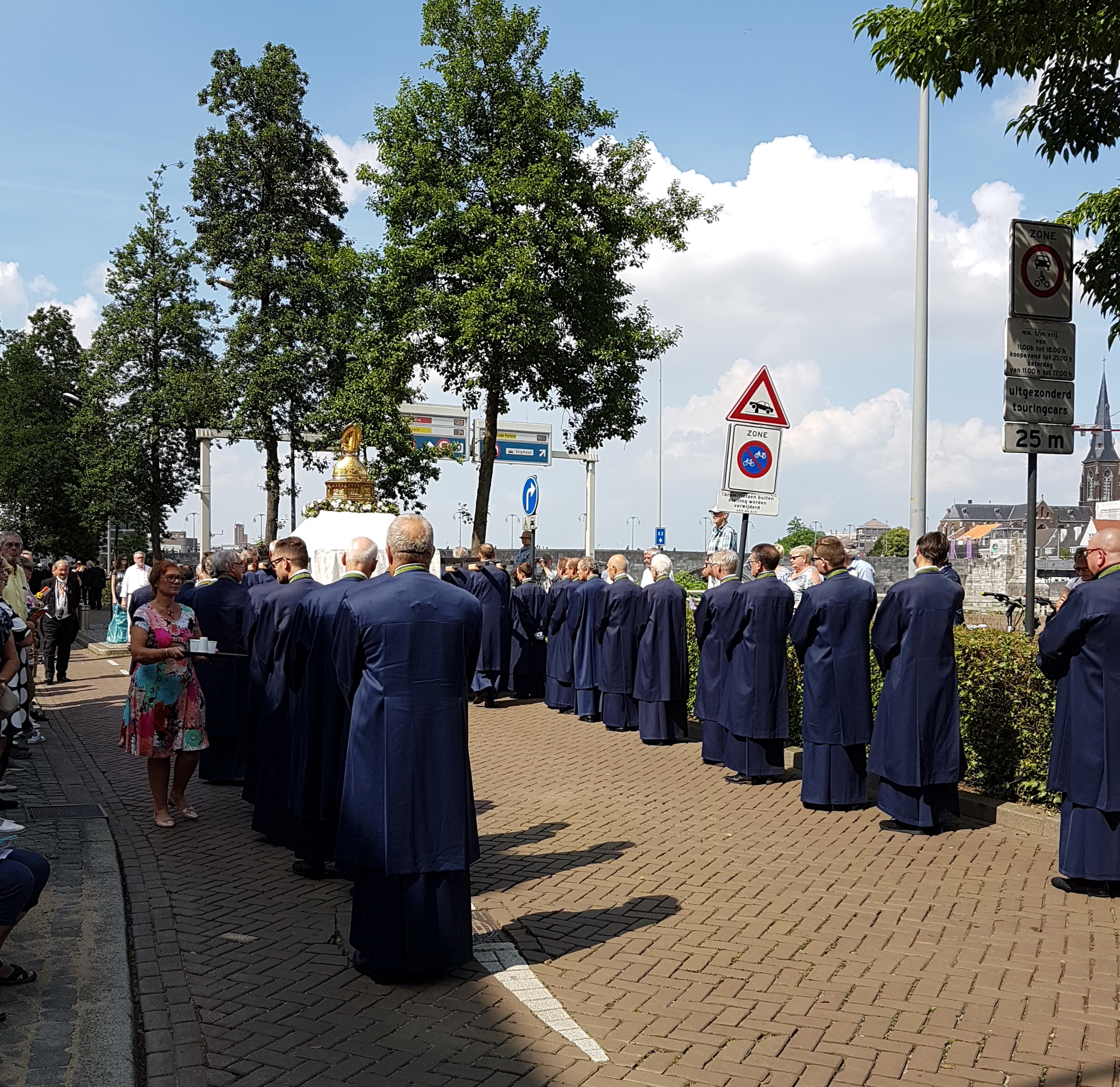
The Guild of Saint Servatius escorting the bust

==== Bust of Saint Lambert ====
The reliquary bust of Saint Lambert is relative young in comparison to the afore-mentioned objects. It was made by the Utrecht silversmiths Edelsmidse Brom for the parish church of St Lambert in 1938-40. This happened after an ambitious parish priest obtained a relic of Saint Lambert, Maastricht's last bishop and the only one who was born there. The relic was picked up in Liège and brought back in triumph by 2,000 parishioners in two extra trains in 1937. The new bust was clearly modelled after the bust of Saint Servatius. It instantly gained popularity, to such a degree that it was included in the Maastricht Devotions. Saint Lambert's church closed in 1985 due to constructional problems and the parish merged with that of Saint Anne. Since 2004 the bust is kept in the modern church of Saint Anne, where in 2018 it was given a separate chapel. The bust of Saint Lambert is carried in processions on either one of two processional litters, depending on the occasion, much like the previously mentioned objects. The small litter is dressed in green; the larger litter in white damask and decorated with flowers. Members of the Carriers Guild of Saint Lambert (Dutch: Dragersgilde St. Lambertus) wear green and yellow tunics; around their neck a chain with an embroidered medallion with an image of the bust and the five-pointed star of Maastricht.

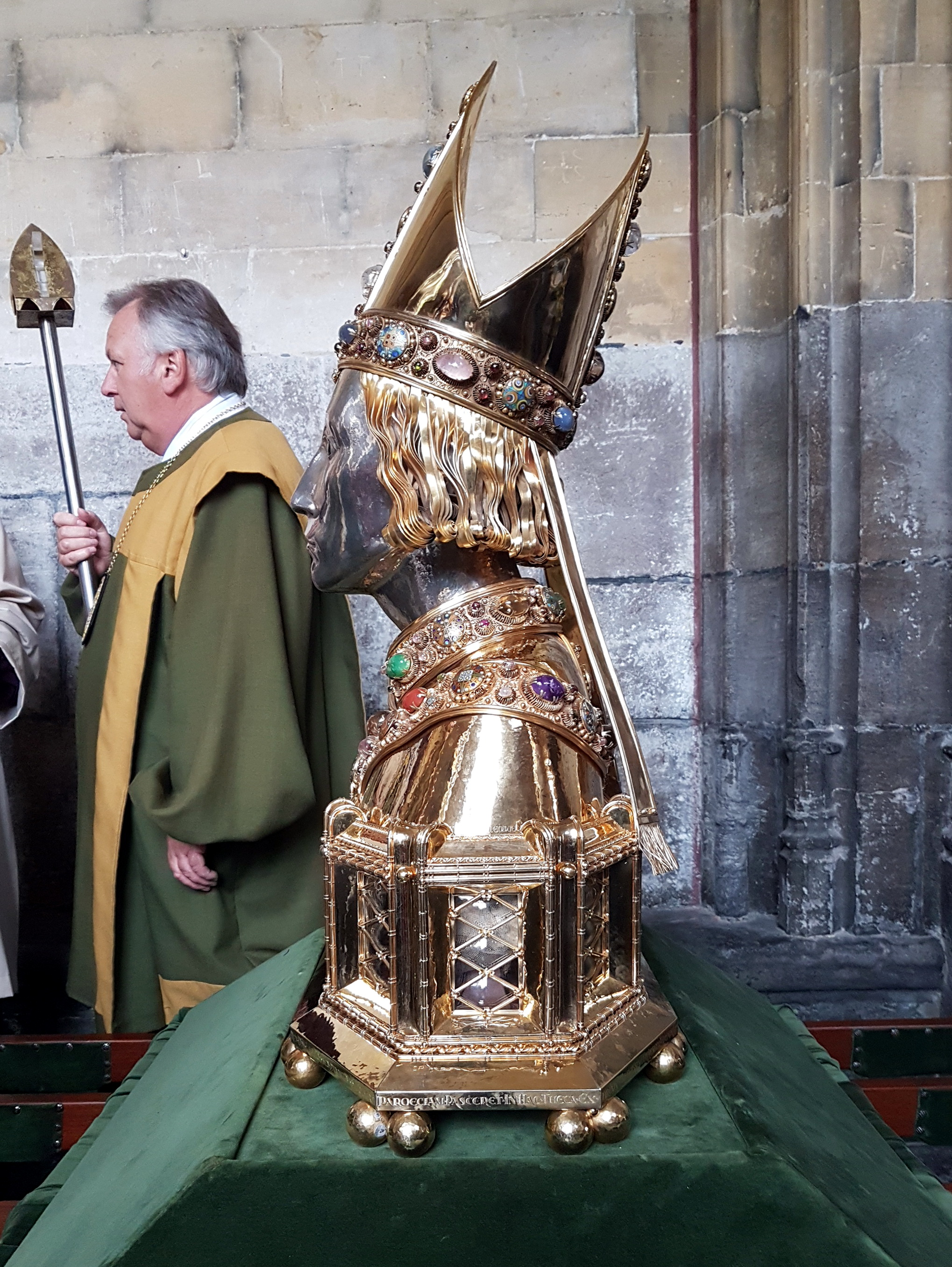
Before the relics display in the cloisters of St Servatius'

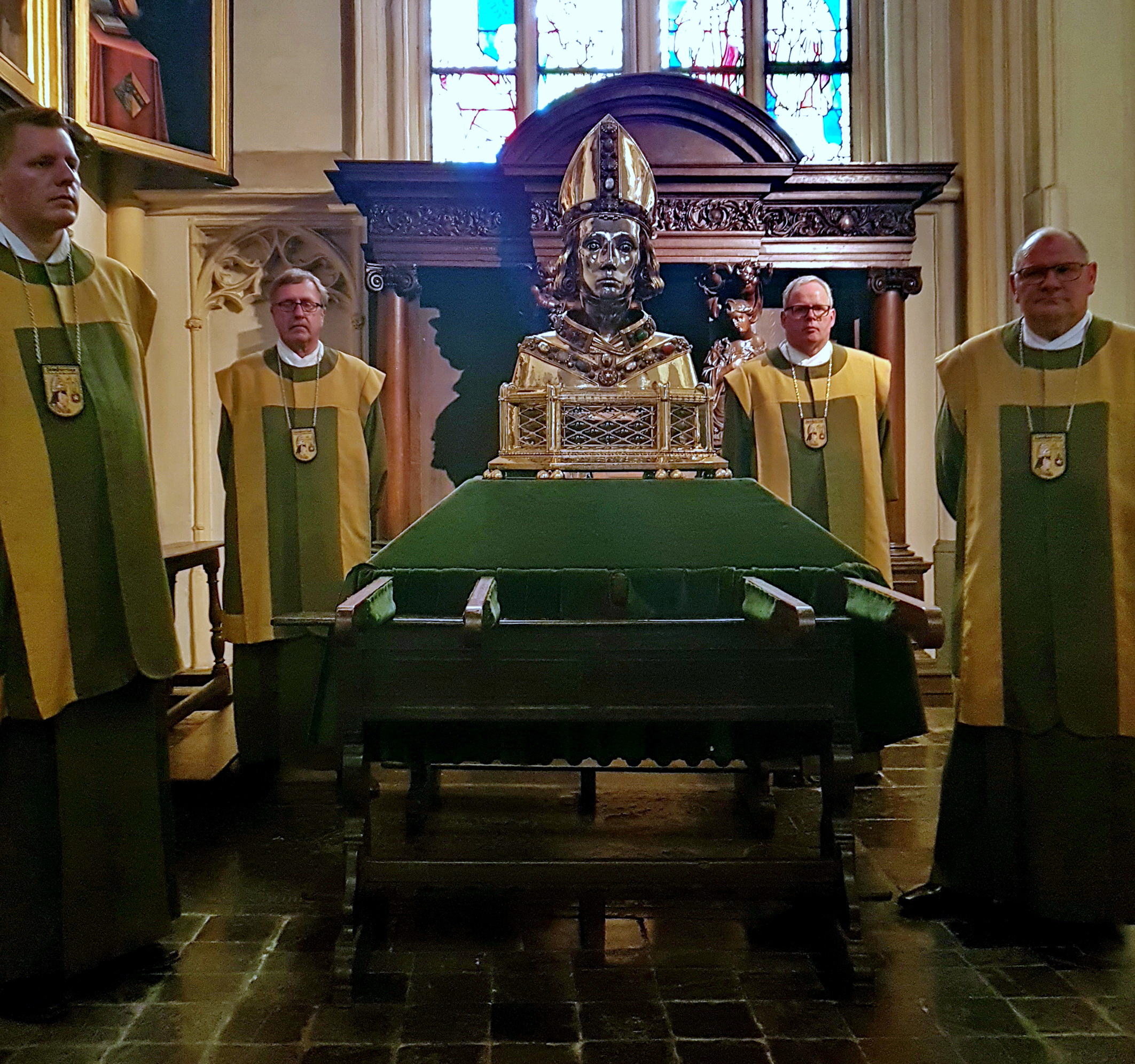
After the relics display in the Chapel of the Sacred Heart

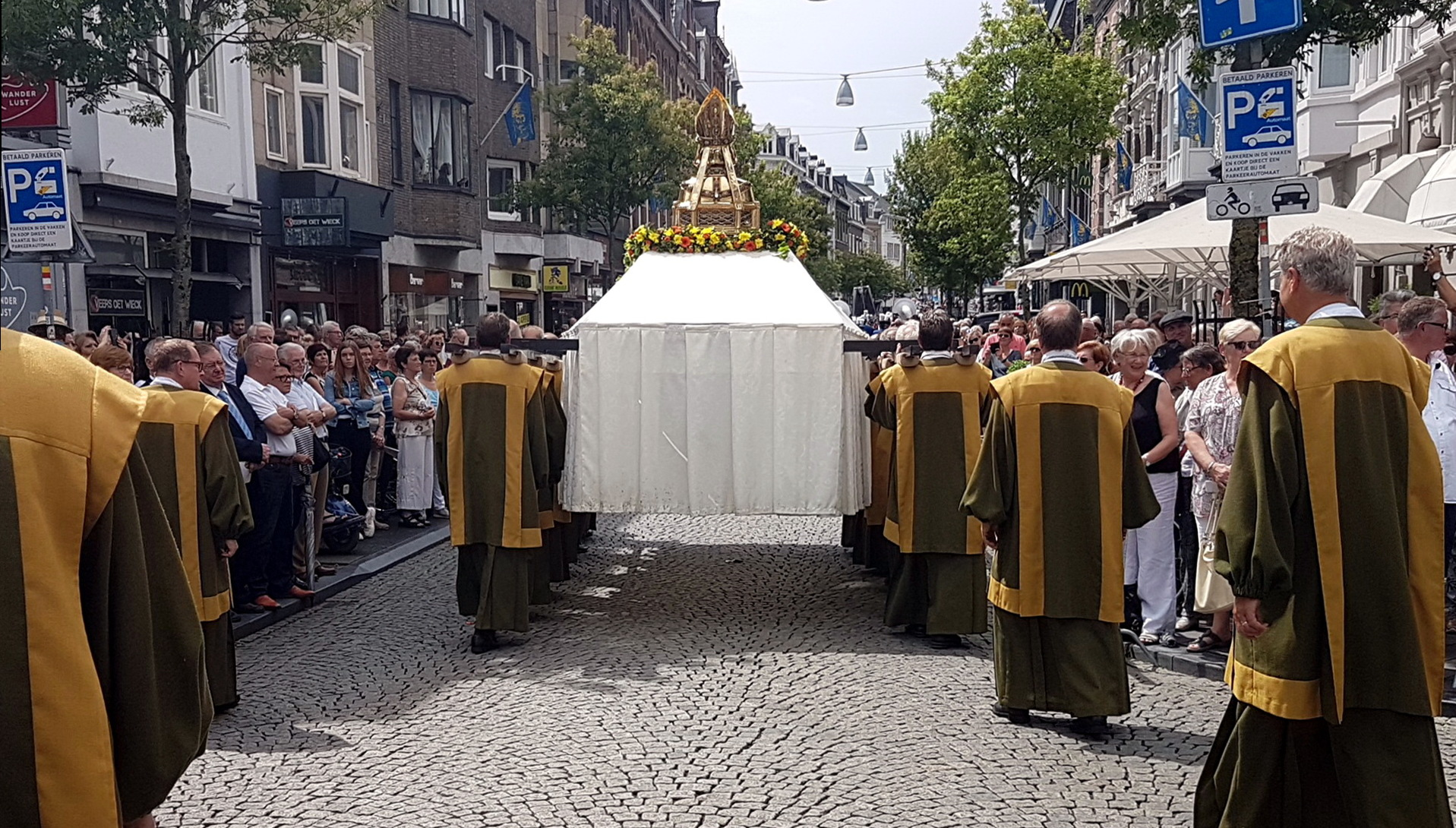
Carriers Guild of Saint Lambert in Wyck

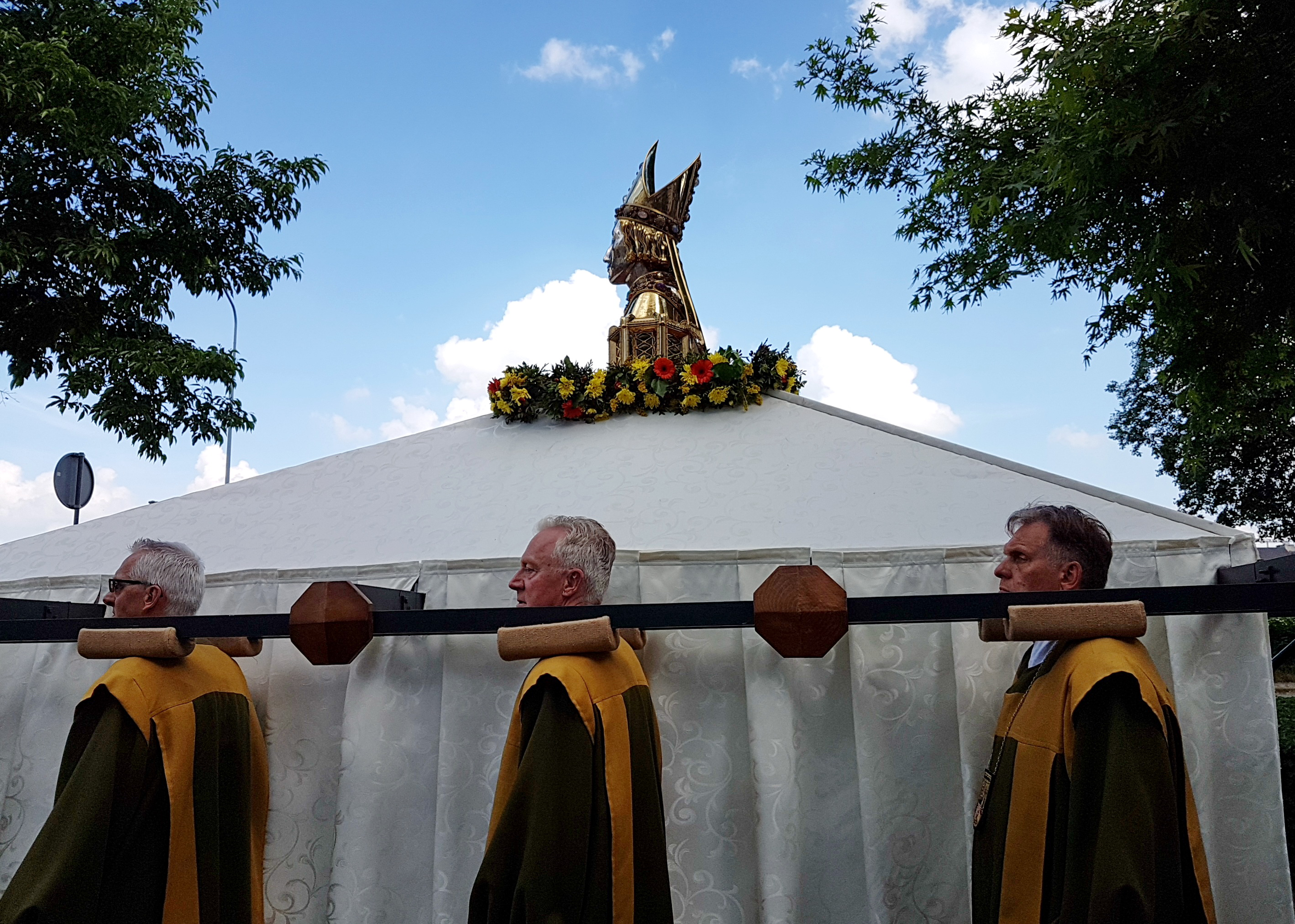
Carrying the large litter along Het Bat

=== Reliquaries and statues ===
Despite the fact that the emphasis in modern pilgrimages has somewhat shifted away from saints and relics worship, the historical and religious significance of the objects concerned makes their presence paramount. Showing the reliquaries remains a central feature of the Maastricht pilgrimage. Apart from the main shrine of Saint Servatius (the Noodkist), these include a number of reliquary busts of apostles and bishops, as well as reliquaries and statues of other locally venerated saints. As mentioned before, many reliquaries are considered too fragile to leave their protected environment. This applies to most of the Servatiana, the alb of Saint Servatius, the cloak of Saint Lambert, several staurothèques (reliquaries of the True Cross), all the reliquary horns in the treasuries (except for the Viking horn in Our Lady's), all the ivory and enamelled caskets, as well as the silver reliquary arm of Saint Thomas.

==== Shrine of Saint Servatius ====
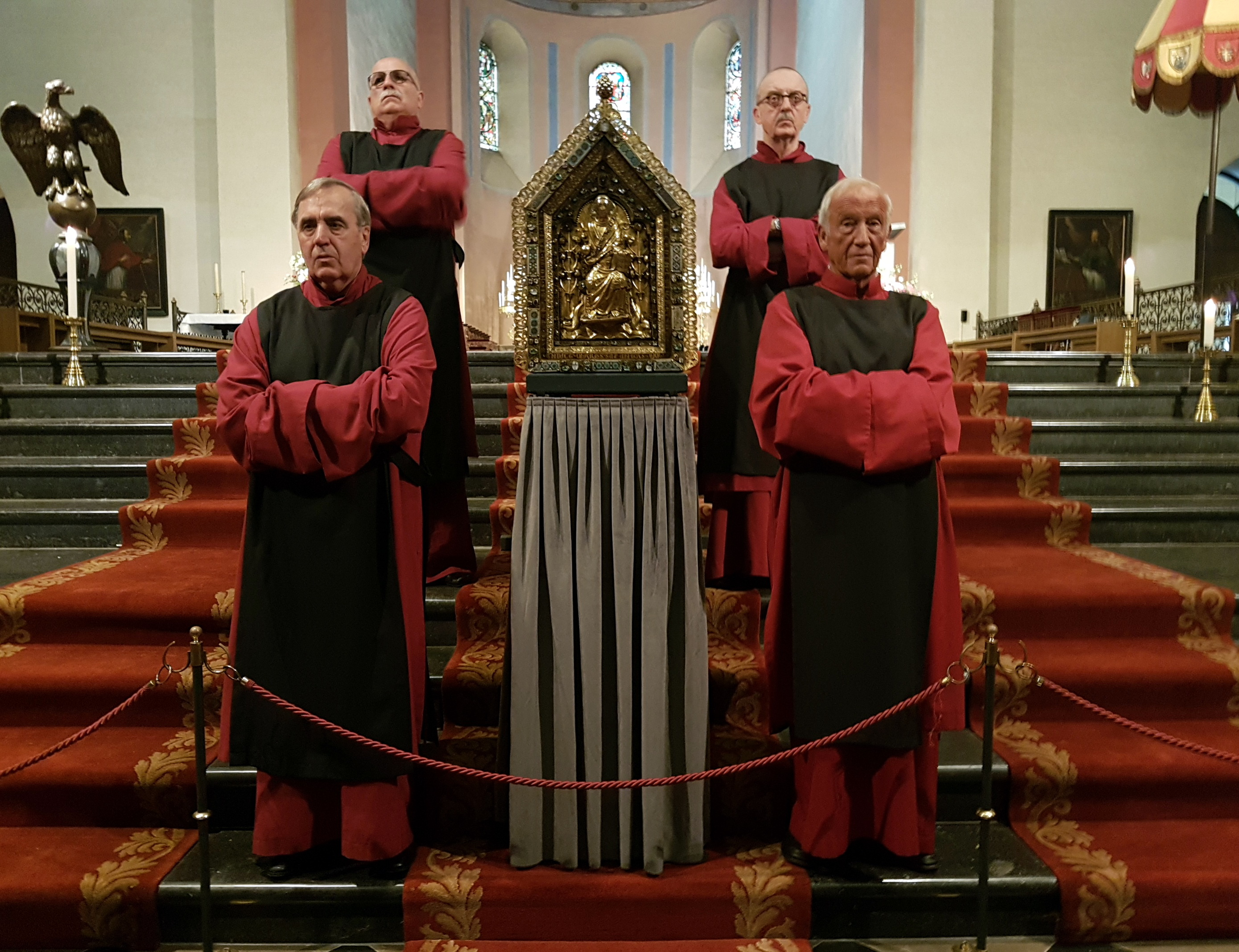
The Noodkist, firmly positioned on the choir steps for the duration of the pilgrimage, guarded by members of the Confraternity of Saint Servatius

The Shrine of Saint Servatius, (Note: The use of the word 'shrine' is a slightly incorrect translation of the German and Dutch term Schrein' or 'schrijn', meaning simply 'box' or 'chest'. In German it has come to mean 'reliquary chest'.) in Dutch usually referred to as Noodkist ('Chest of Distress'), is a 12th-century chest that contains the bodily remains of bishop Servatius of Maastricht-Tongeren. The wooden chest with elaborate gilded copper reliefs, champlevé enamels and precious stones is the main treasure of the Basilica of St Servatius and arguably the most important medieval object in the Netherlands. Its significance as a major product of Mosan metalwork has been recognised internationally. (Note: The Noodkist was one of the few objects from Dutch collections that was included in the grand exhibition Rhine and Meuse. Art and Culture 800-1400, held in Brussels and Cologne in 1972. H. Schnitzler, J. Lejeune, and others (eds.) (1972): Rijn en Maas. Kunst en Cultuur 800-1400 (exhibition catalogue), pp. 245-246. Schnütgen Museum & Belgian Ministries of Dutch and French Culture, Cologne/Brussels.) For centuries the Noodkist was the centre of veneration of Maastricht's patron, Saint Servatius, receiving its nickname from the custom of taking it out in procession in times of distress (first mentioned in 1409). Not much is known about its role in the medieval pilgrimage practices. For obvious reasons it could not be shown from the dwarf gallery. Normally it stood on a stone altar behind the high altar, covered by a capsa, a painted wooden box. During the pilgrimage the capsa was removed and pilgrims were given access to the chancel. They were even allowed to touch the chest.

After the revival of the pilgrimage in the 19th century, the chest has been part of most festivities. Nowadays, it is permanently exhibited on the choir stairs (which in fact are situated in the crossing). When the church is open to the public, the chest is permanently guarded by two or four members of the Confraternity of Saint Servatius. This association was founded in 1916 and currently has around 50 members. Inside the church they wear tunics, either yellow and red, or black and red. The fraternity members also escort the chest when it leaves the church in processions, which normally only happens once a year (Saint Servatius Day, 13 May). The brotherhood then wears morning dress with red and white rosettes and fraternity medals. The processional litter is custom-designed featuring a steel structure with flexible parts that can be adjusted on the shoulders of the carriers. There are normally two teams of sixteen fraternity brothers involved in carrying the chest. The lower part of the frame is covered with grey fabric. A perspex box in the shape of the Noodkist covers it, regardless of the weather.

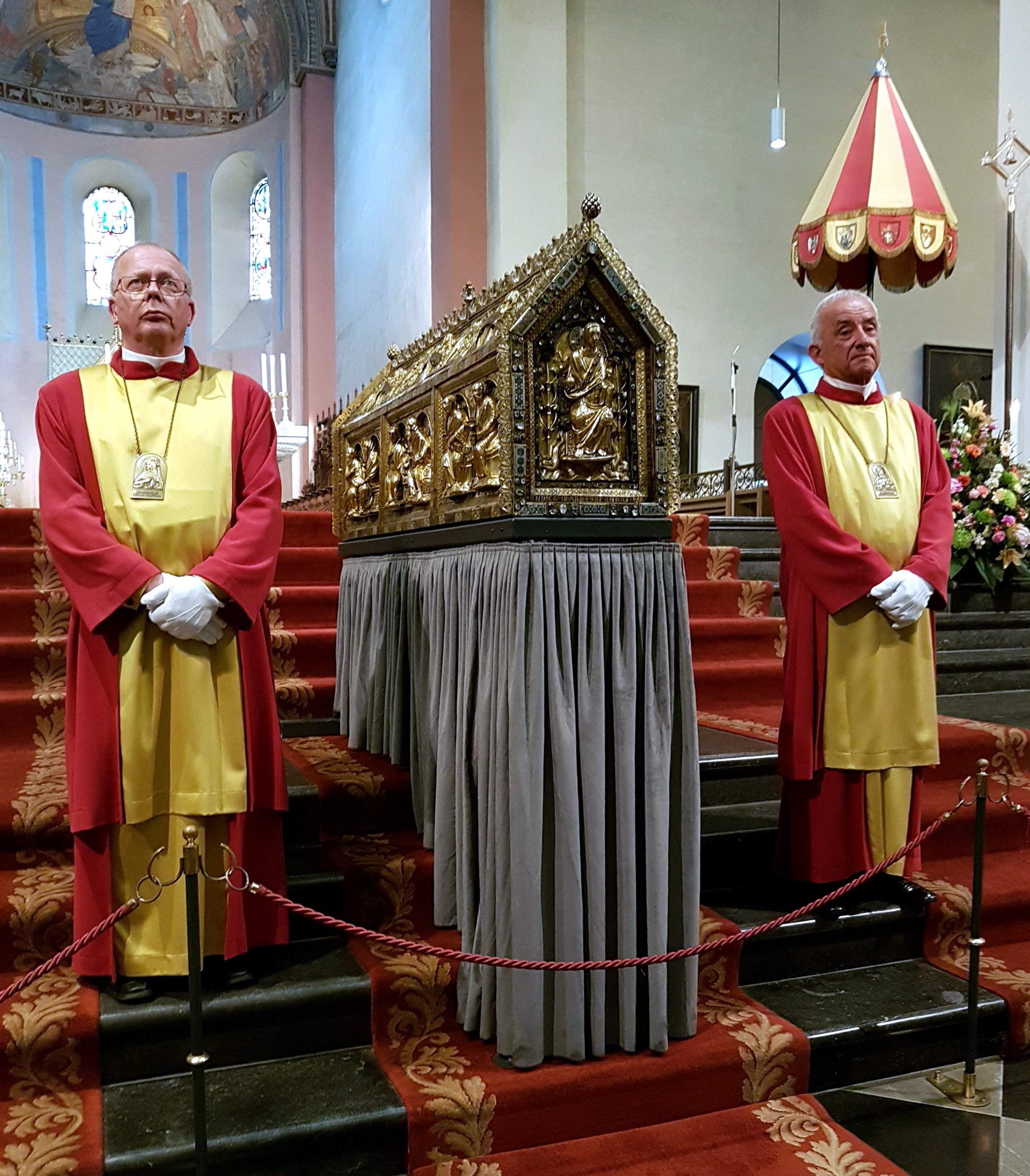
The Noodkist on the choir stairs, with 2 guards

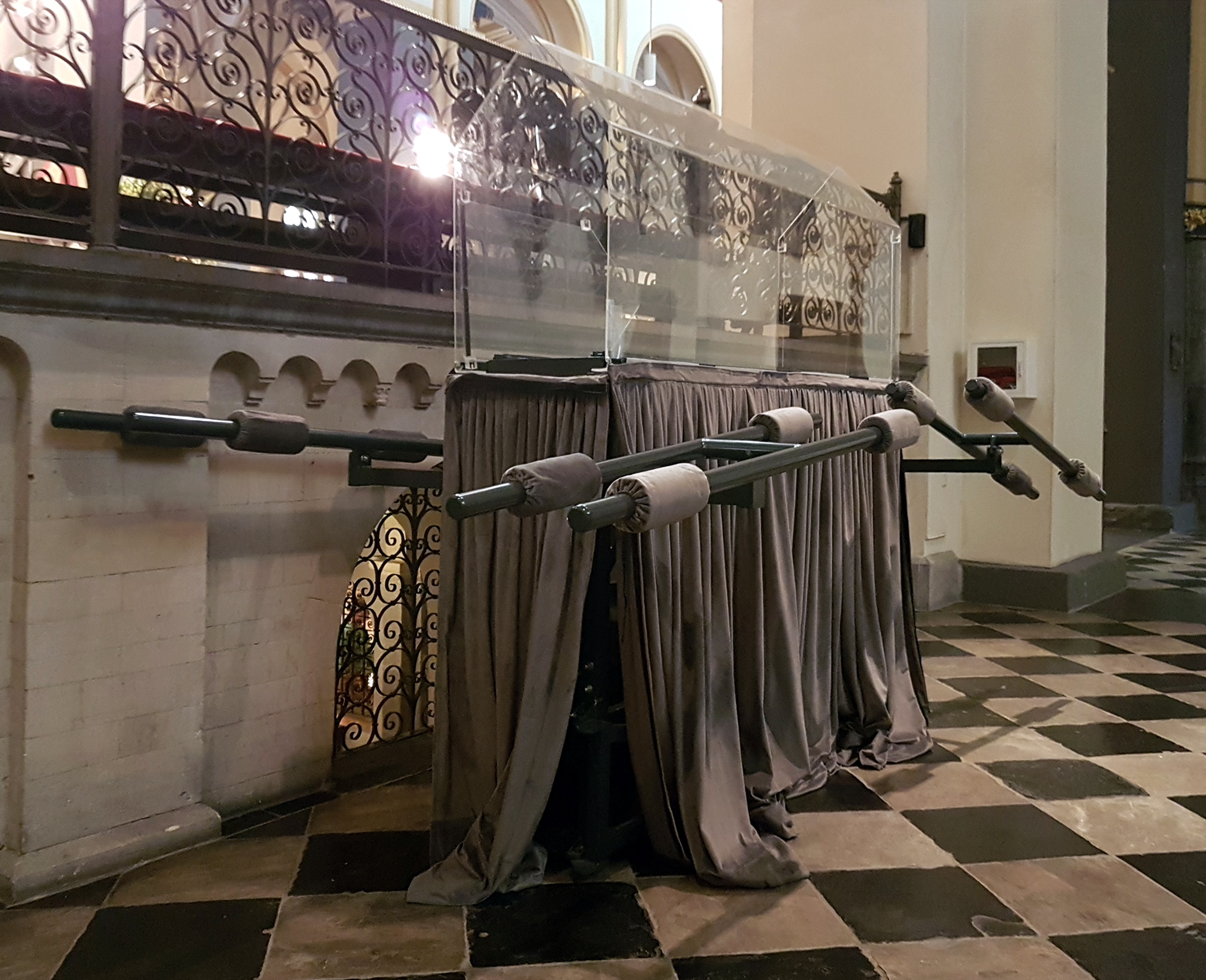
The processional litter with perspex cover for the chest

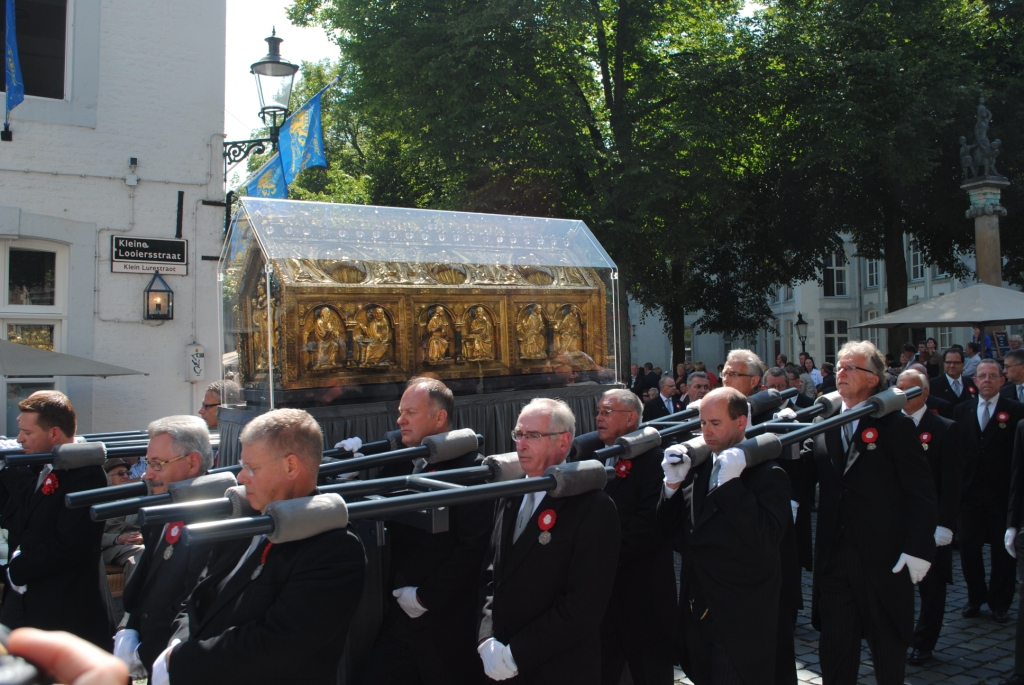
During the procession at Grote Looiersgracht, 2011

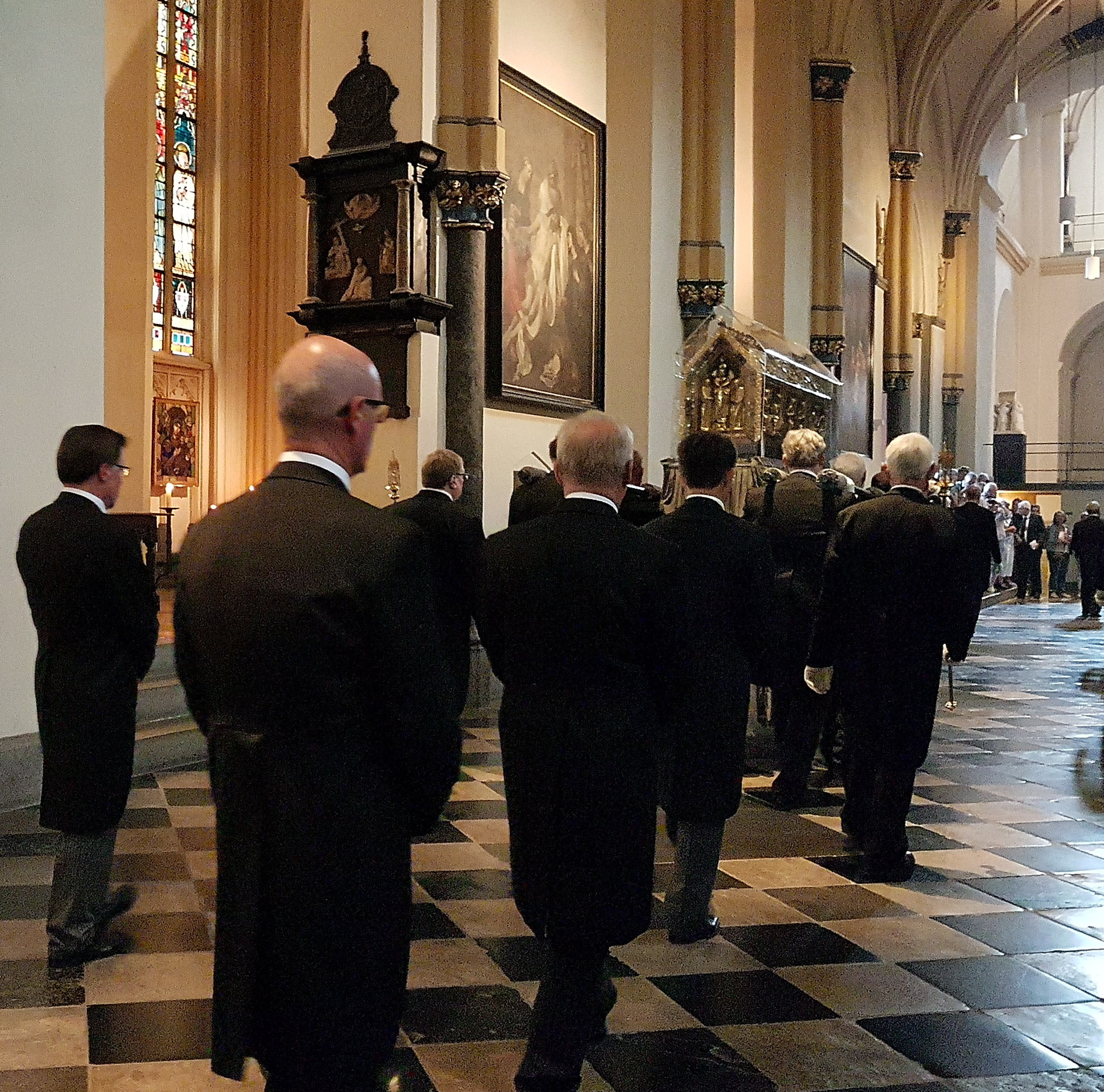
Returning to the church after the procession, 2018

==== Reliquary busts ====
Amongst the many reliquaries and devotional objects in Maastricht are a dozen reliquary busts. The busts discussed here predominantly date from the 19th century, made of wood and then polychromed. They replace the silver or gilded busts that were lost in the French Period. There are a few remarkable 'doubles'. Both the Basilica of Our Lady and the Basilica of St Servatius own busts of Monulph and Gondulph, the 6th-century bishops of Maastricht often associated with one another. All four busts are shown during the relics display in the churches but only one set joins the outdoor processions (the set owned by St Servatius'). They are carried on relatively small litters by members of the Guild of Saint Monulph and Saint Gondulph, which also is a bell-ringers guild. Naturally, both churches own a bust of Saint Servatius. The one in Our Lady's is merely used for the relics display in the church. The same goes for Saint Batholomew's and Saint Hubert's busts, also in Our Lady's. St Servatius' Basilica has two busts of Saint Lambert (one silver bust is on loan from the Rijksmuseum and never leaves the treasury), which in fact makes three, together with the bust in St Anne's. St Servatius' also owns a bust of Saint Amandus, another bishop of Maastricht. Regular 'visiting' busts from other churches and other towns are the bust of Saint Anthony of Padua (from the Maastricht parish of Scharn), the bust of Saint Amelberga (from Susteren Abbey), the silver bust of Saint Gerlach (from the parish of Houthem-Sint Gerlach).

Note: the gilded and silver-coated busts of Saint Servatius and Saint Lambert are discussed in detail above (see: 'Maastricht Devotions').

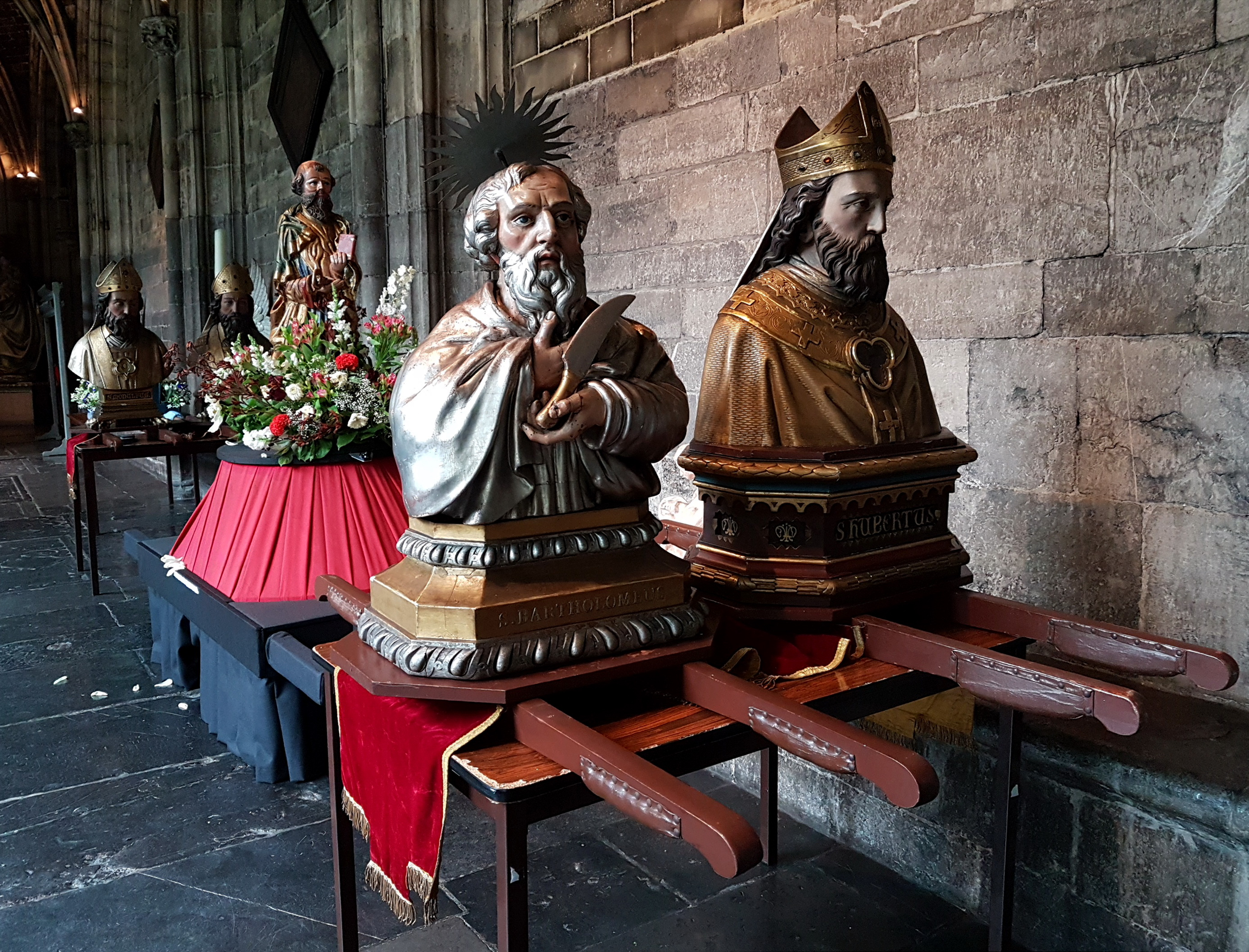
Processional litters with busts of Bartholomew, Hubert & others, cloisters of Our Lady's

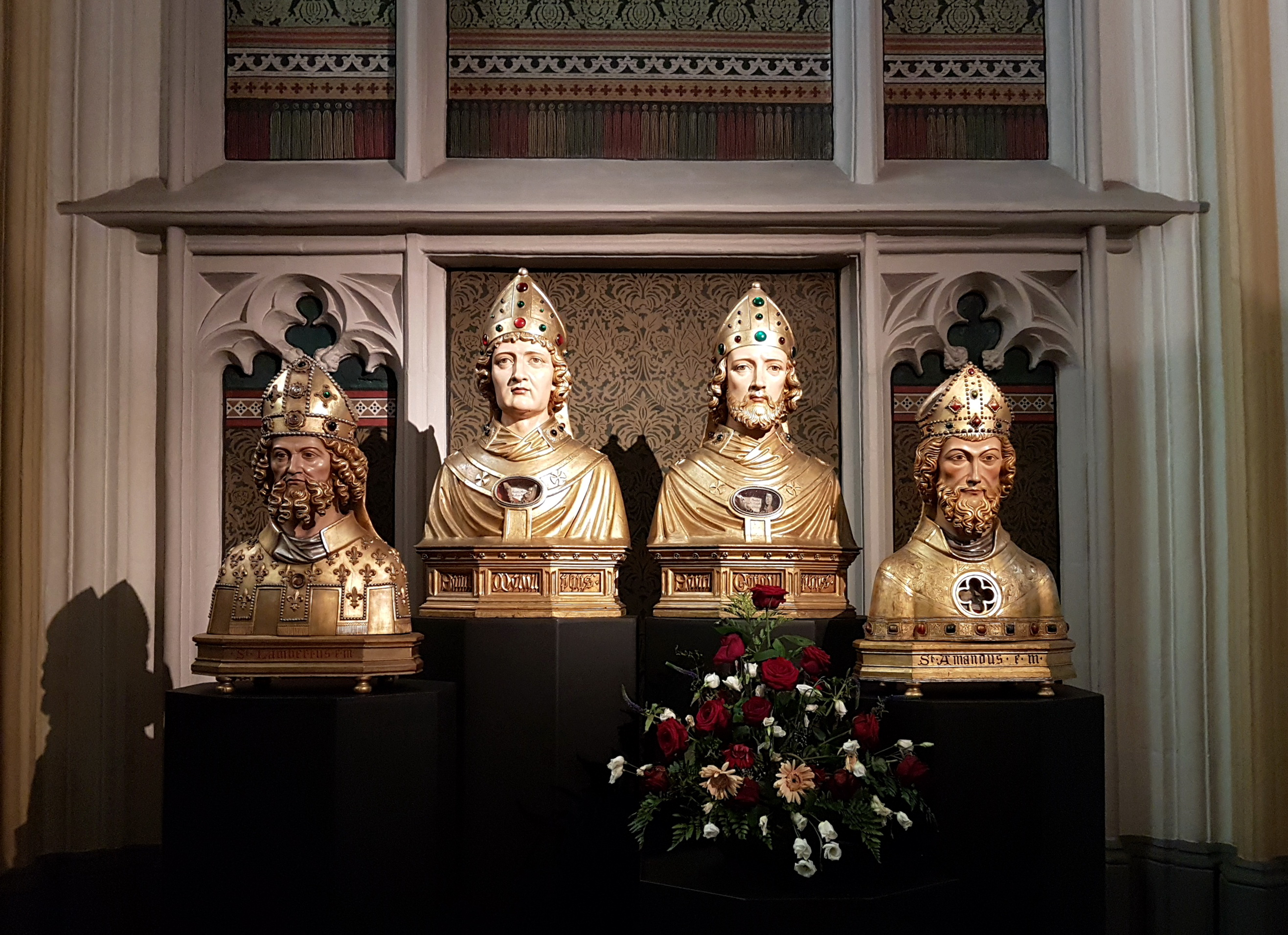
Busts of Lambert, Monulph, Gondulph & Amandus, Sacred Heart Chapel

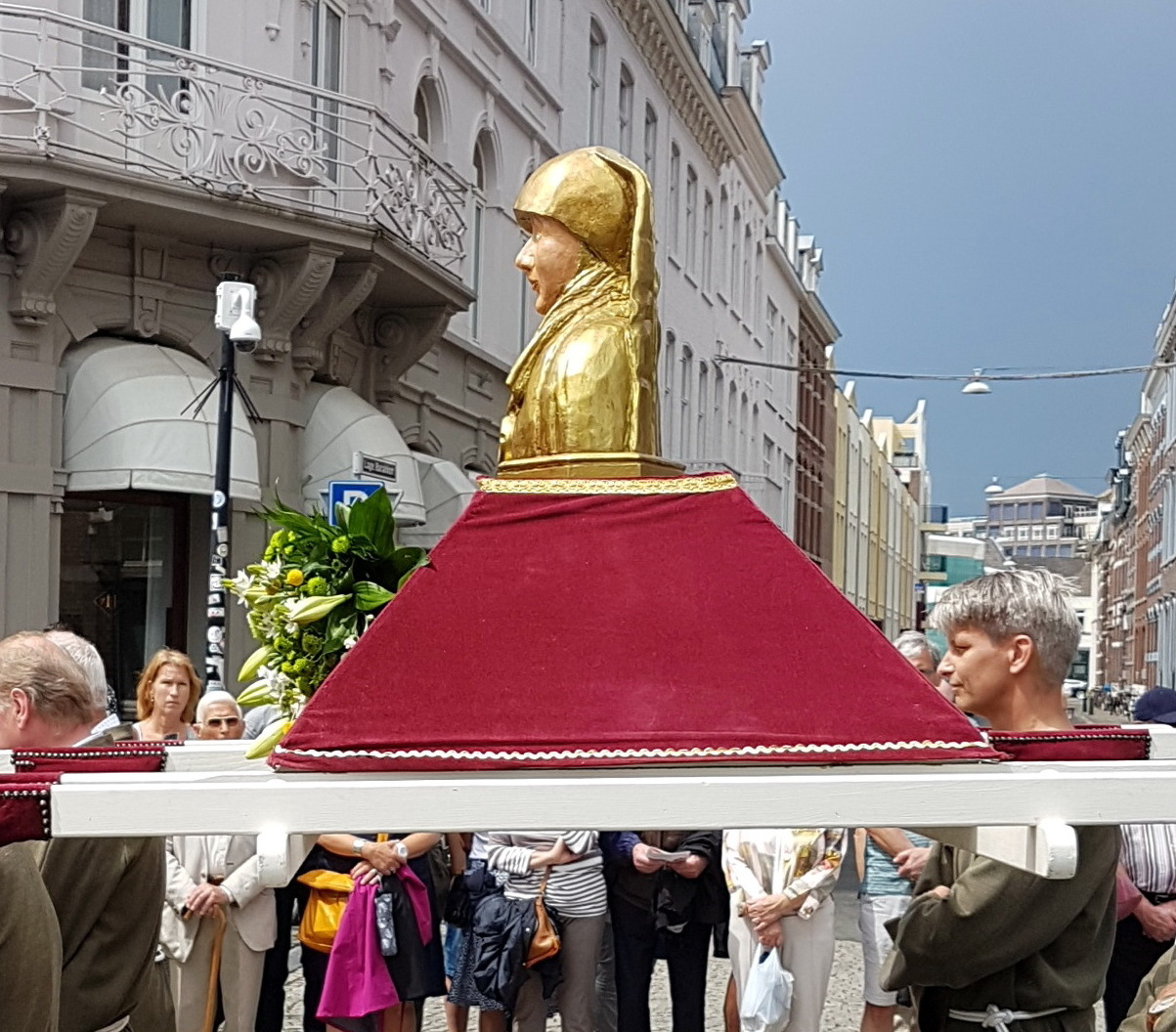
Bust of Amelberga of Susteren in the procession in Wyck

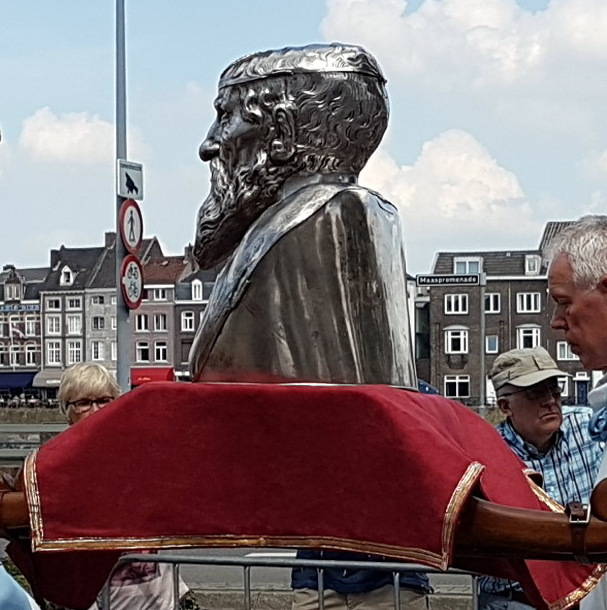
Silver bust of Gerlachus of Houthem in the procession in Het Bat

==== Other reliquaries ====
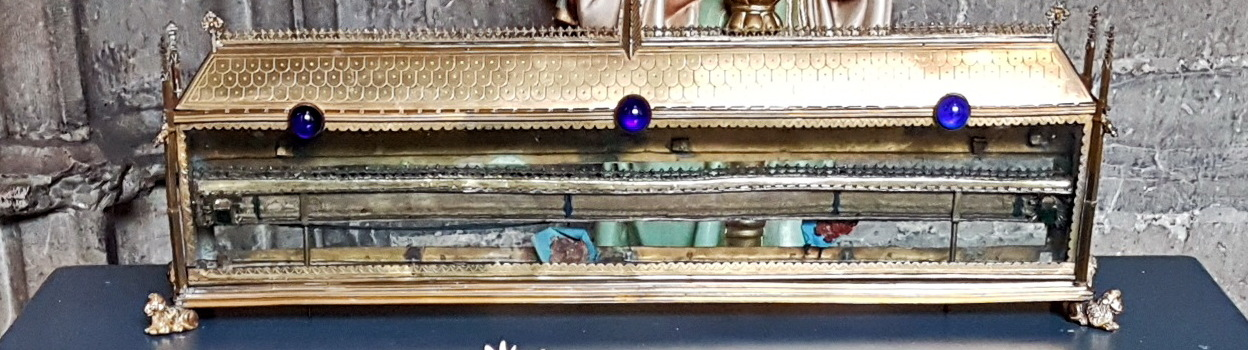
Reliquary with the girdle of Saint Mary, waiting in the cloisters of Our Lady's before the relics display

A few reliquaries do not fit into the categories above but are nevertheless important enough to be included in the pilgrimage. A distinguished piece – even though it is a 15th-century copy of a much older cross – is the Patriarchal Cross of the Basilica of St Servatius. It contains several large pieces of the True Cross. It is carried by a priest as a processional cross at the entrance procession during the ceremony of the relics display. It is however too fragile to participate in any other processions. That would perhaps also apply to the reliquary with the girdle of Saint Mary in Our Lady's Basilica, were it not that this relic is considered too vital to be excluded. The core of the reliquary is medieval (first mentioned in 1286) but the outer case was replaced in the 19th century. Both inside the church and in the outdoor processions it is carried and escorted by a group of women in light-blue dresses. Two women carry the processional litter; the others hold red roses.

Since the Second World War, a number of important relics have 'visited' Maastricht (see: 'History/20th century'). In 2018 there were busts from Houthem and Susteren (mentioned above), a cross reliquary from Dordrecht, a reliquary of Saint Lidwina from Schiedam, and a reliquary of Saint Cassius and Florentius (martyrs of the Theban Legion) from Bonn.

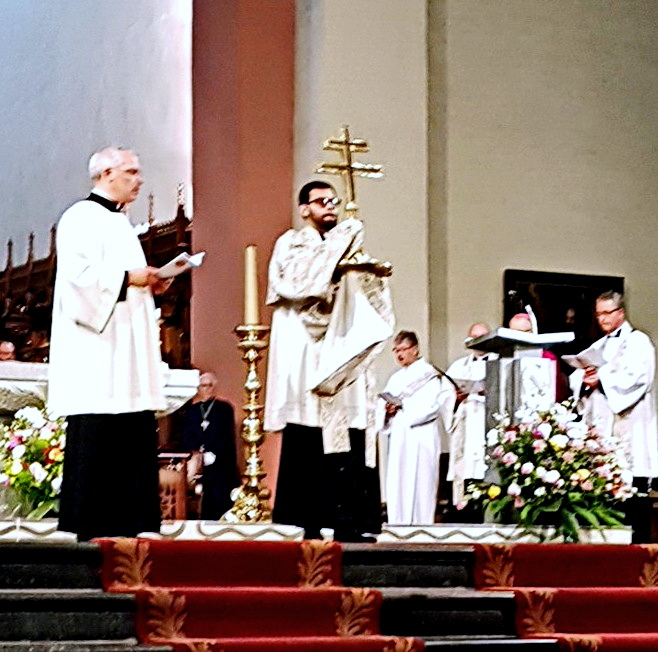
Patriarchal cross during the relics display in St Servatius'

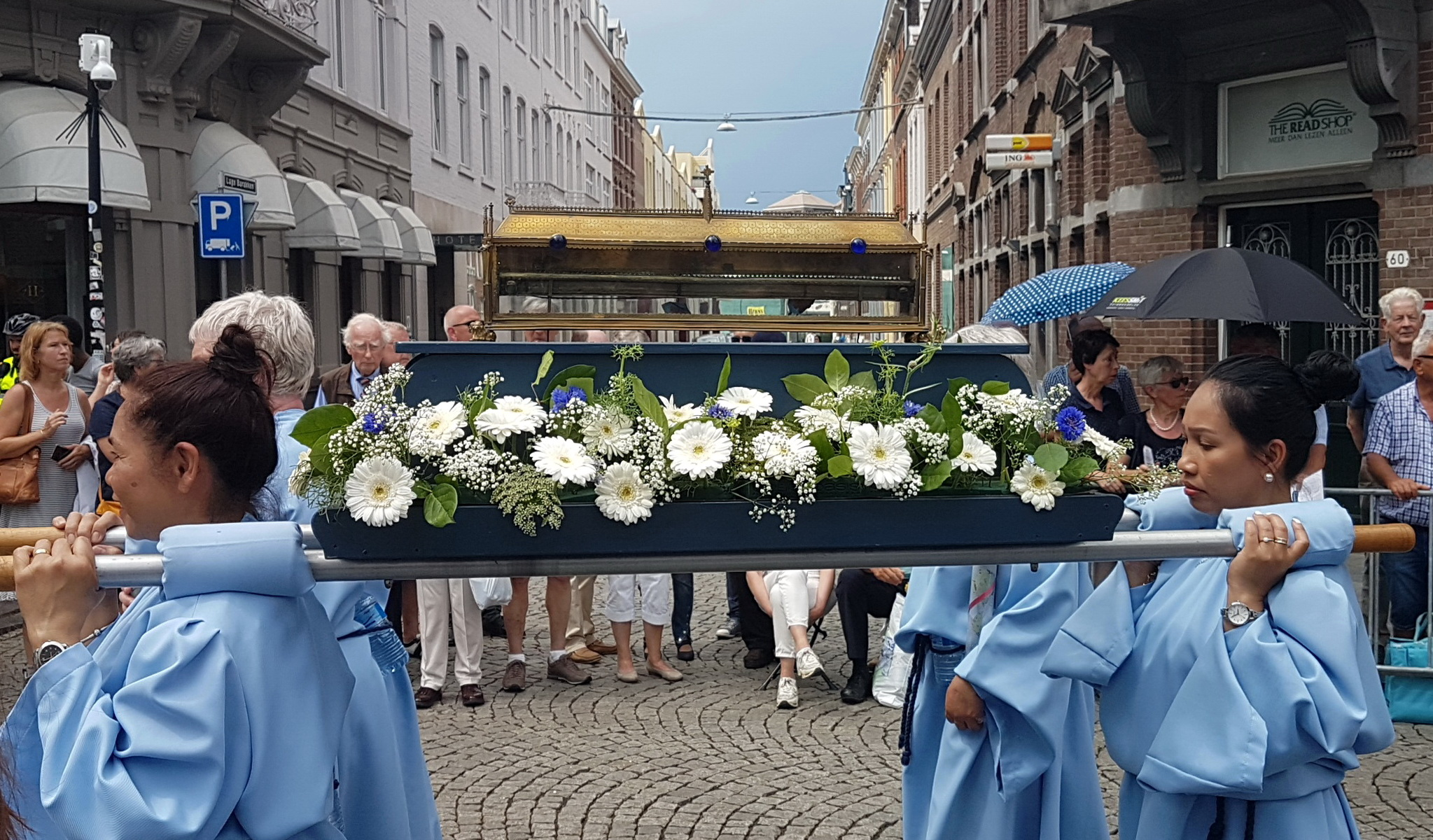
Girdle of Saint Mary during the procession in Wyck

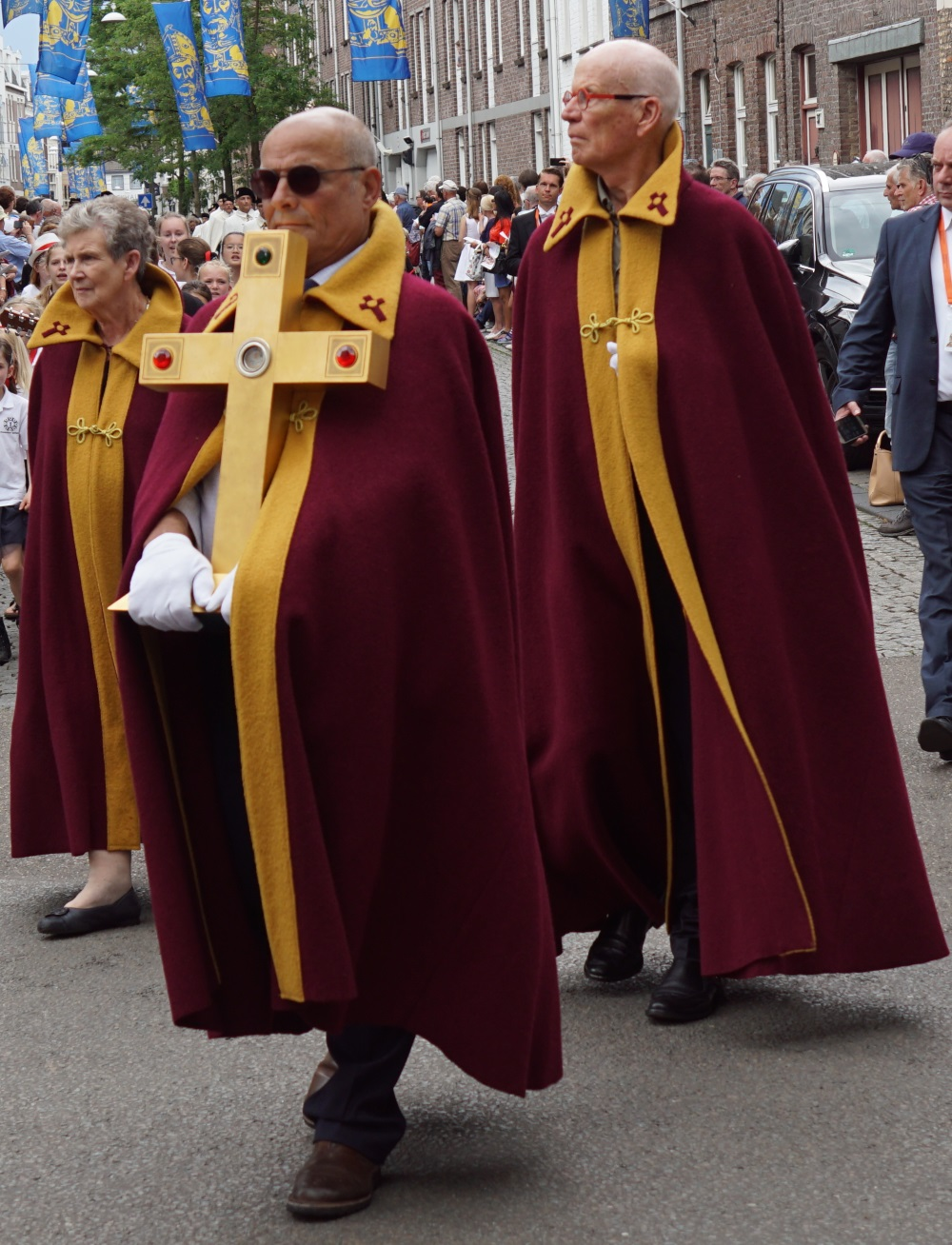
Dordrecht cross reliquary during the procession in Wyck

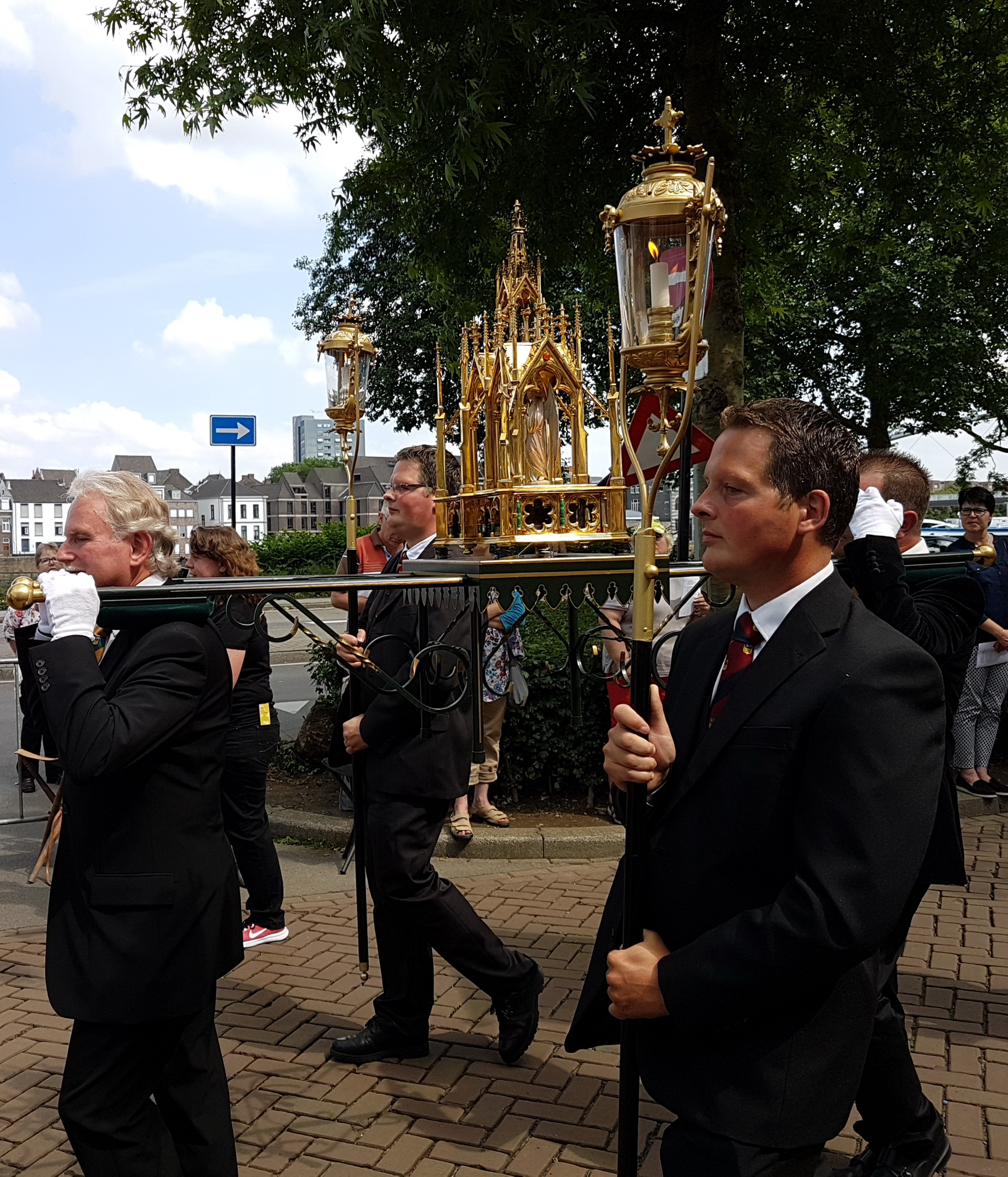
Reliquary of Lidwina of Schiedam during the procession in Het Bat

==== Other statues ====
Besides the four main devotional statues (see: 'Maastricht Devotions'), there are a few other statues of saints that are included in the Maastricht pilgrimage. Some Maastricht parishes are represented in the pilgrimage processions with their patron saint, each with their own carriers guild. A 15th-century statue of Saint Peter hails from the parish of Sint Pieter (in fact two parishes: one at the bottom of Sint-Pietersberg, the other one halfway up the hill). The parish of Saint Anthony of Padua in Scharn is represented both with a bust (mentioned above) and a 17th-century(?) statue of the saint. Nearby Amby participates with a statue of Saint Walpurga. A special guest in 2018 was the statue of Our Lady, Cause of Our Joy, from the Basilica of Our Lady in Tongeren.

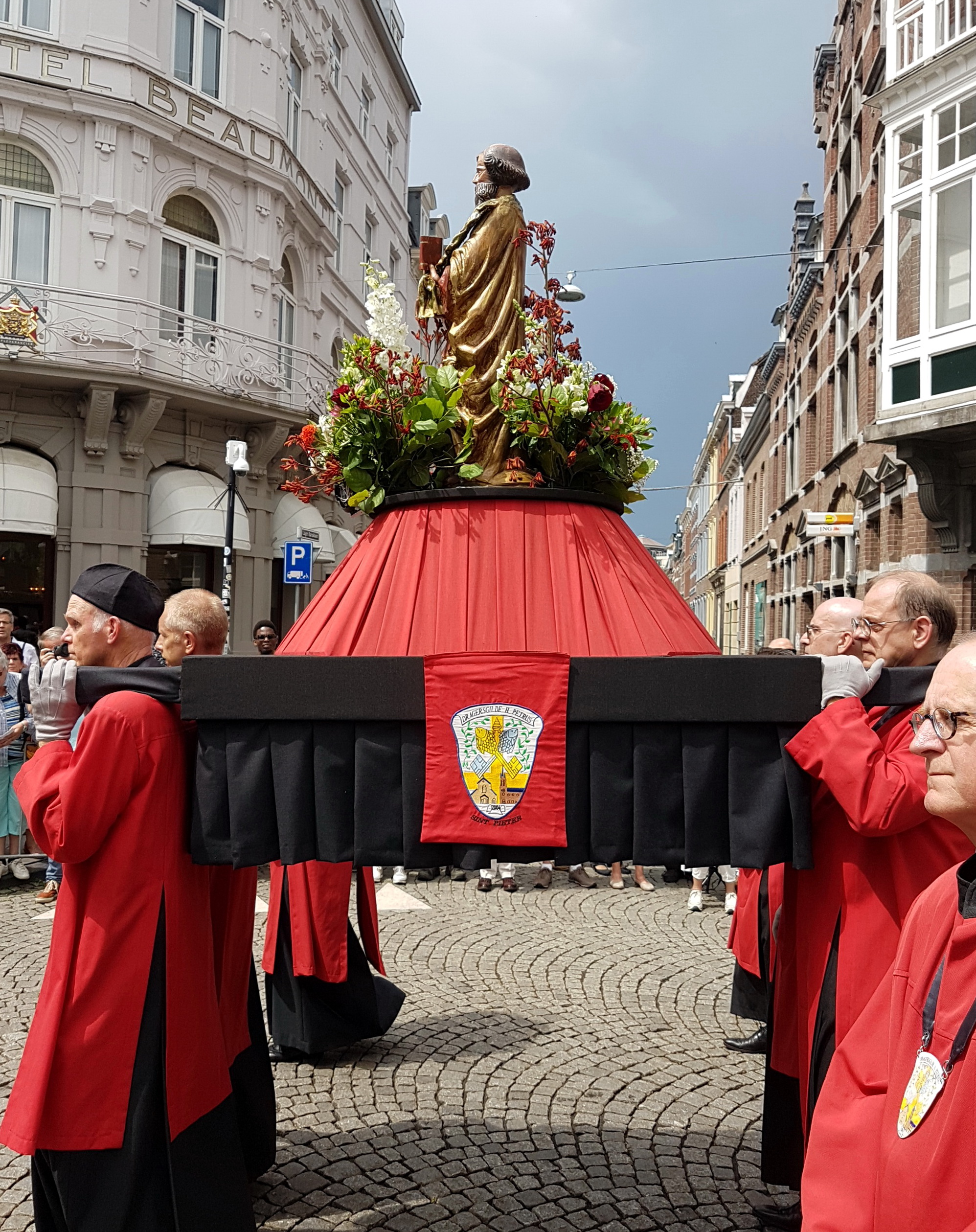
Saint Peter, Sint Pieter

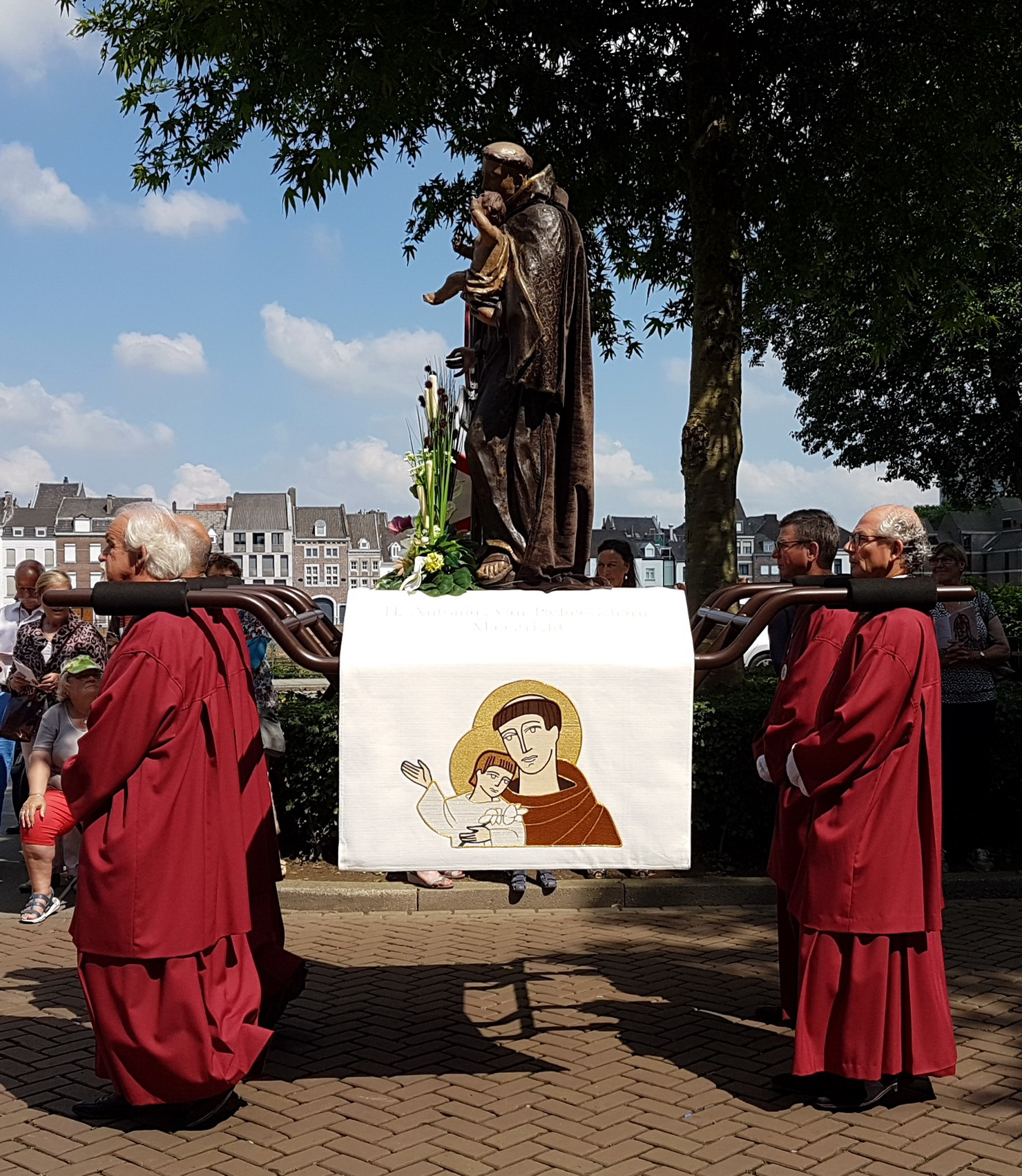
Saint Anthony, Scharn

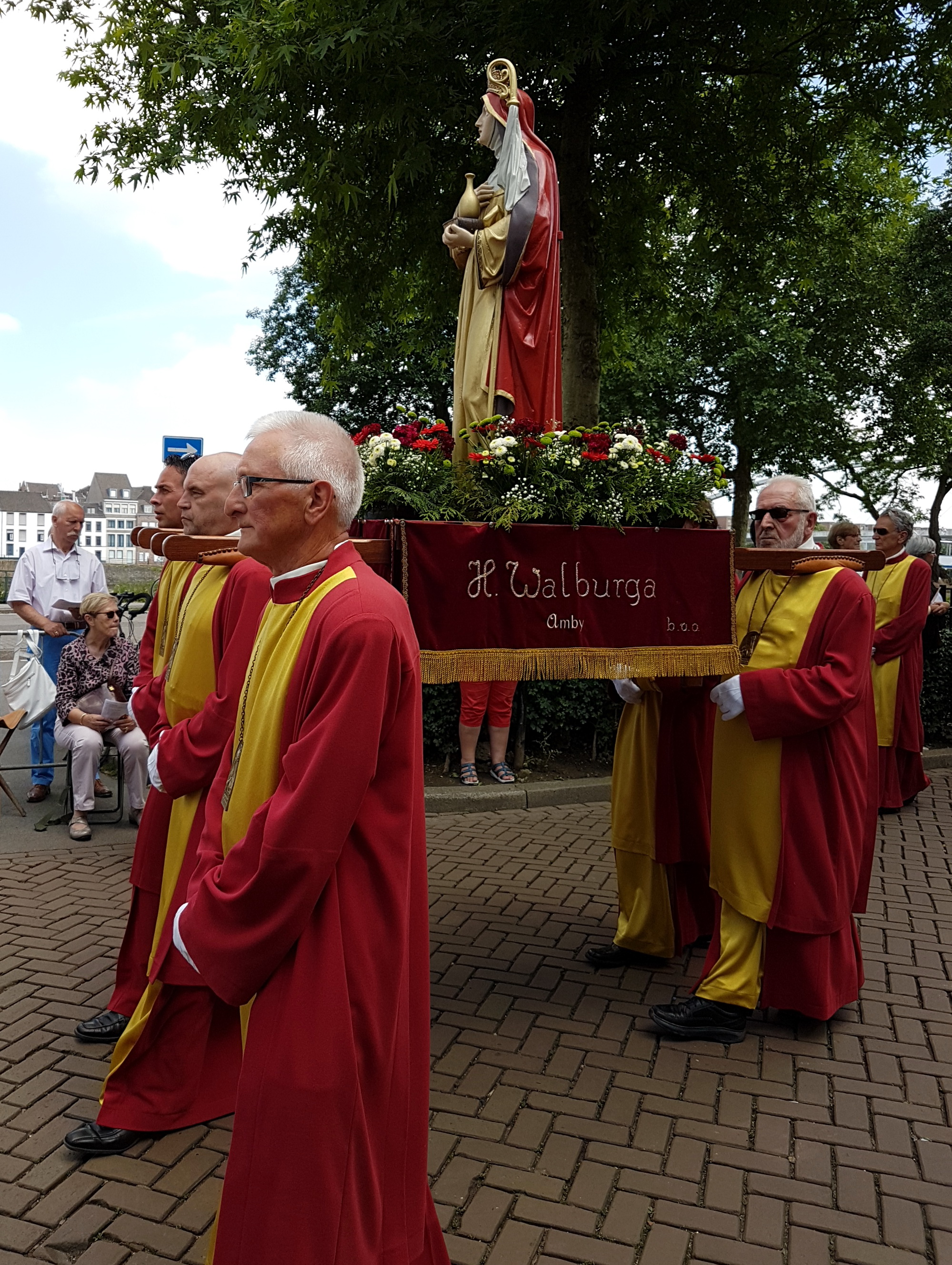
Saint Walpurga, Amby

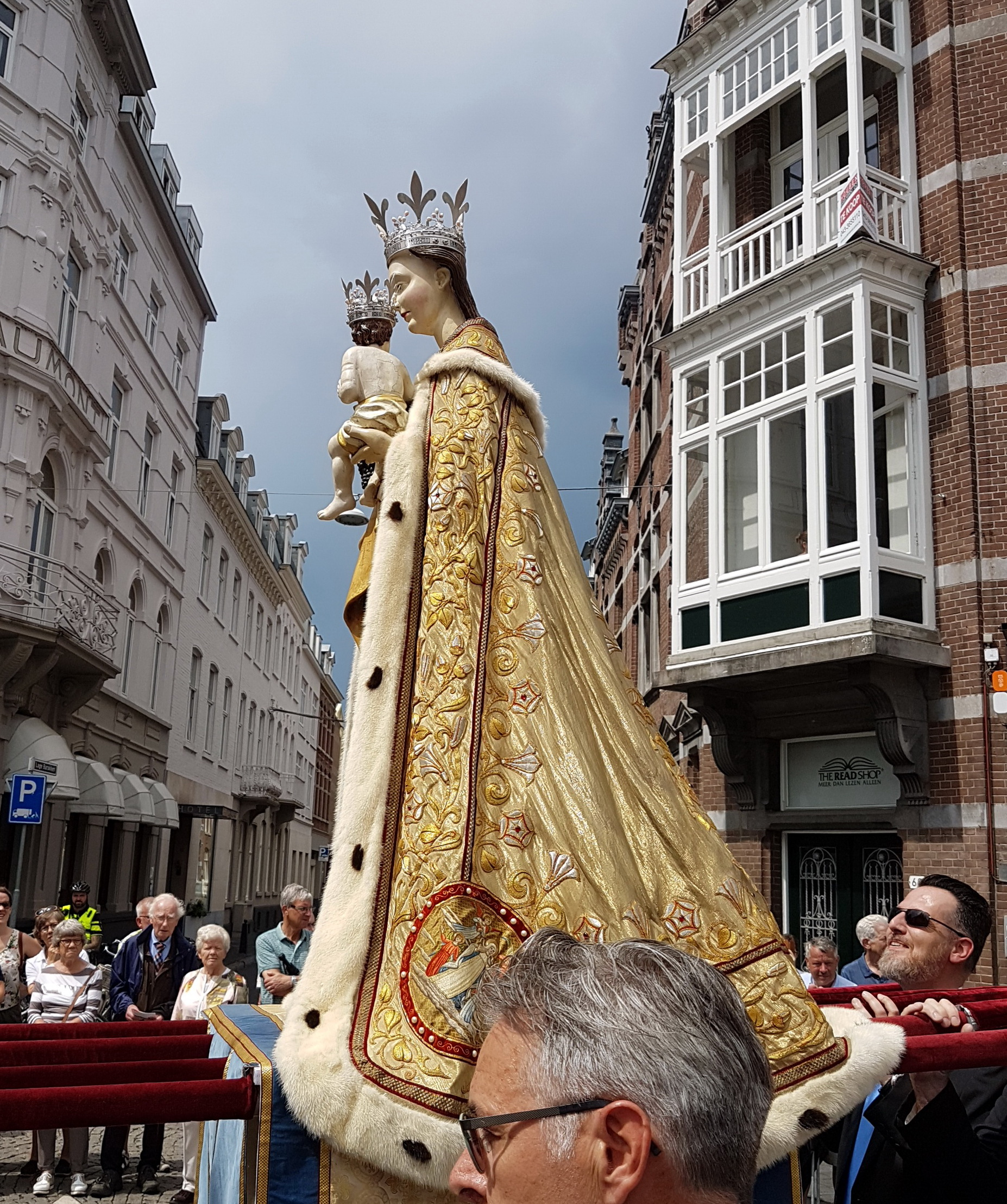
Our Lady of Tongeren

== See also ==
- Treasury of the Basilica of Saint Servatius
- Limousin septennial ostensions

== Sources ==
- Ahsmann, Fred (2017): Order and Confusion. The Twelfth-Century Choir of the St. Servatius Church in Maastricht. Clavis Kunsthistorische Monografieën, Part XXIV. Clavis Stichting Middeleeuwse Kunst, Utrecht. ISBN 978-90-75616-13-2
- Bock, F., & M. Willemsen (1872): Die mittelalterlichen Kunst- und Reliquienschätze zu Maestricht, aufbewahrt in den ehemaligen Stiftskirchen des h. Servatius und Unserer Lieben Frau daselbst, usw. L. Schwann, Cologne/Neuss
- Haye, R. de La (1990): 'Geschiedenis van de Maastrichtse Heiligdomsvaart'. In: Th.J. van Rensch, A.M. Koldeweij, R.M. de la Haye, M.L. de Kreek (1990): Hemelse trektochten. Broederschappen in Maastricht 1400-1850. Vierkant Maastricht #16. Stichting Historische Reeks Maastricht, Maastricht. ISBN 90-70356-55-4 (online text on academia.edu)
- Koldeweij, A.M. (1985): Der gude Sente Servas. Maaslandse Monografieën #5. Van Gorcum, Assen/Maastricht. ISBN 9023221192
- Koldeweij, A.M. (1990): 'Pelgrimages'. In: Th.J. van Rensch, A.M. Koldeweij, R.M. de la Haye, M.L. de Kreek (1990): Hemelse trektochten. Broederschappen in Maastricht 1400-1850. Vierkant Maastricht #16. Stichting Historische Reeks Maastricht, Maastricht. ISBN 90-70356-55-4
- Koldeweij, A.M. (2000): 'Das Servatiusbustenreliquiar in der Maastrichter Servatiuskirche und seine liturgische Nutzung'. In: Kunst und Liturgie im Mittelalter: Akten des internationalen Kongresses der Bibliotheca Hertziana und des Nederlands Instituut te Rome, Rom, 28. - 30. September 1997. Nicolas Bock, Munich (online text on academia.edu)
- Kroos, Renate (1985): Der Schrein des heiligen Servatius in Maastricht und die vier zugehörigen Reliquiare in Brüssel. Zentralinstitut für Kunstgeschichte, Munich. ISBN 3422007725
- Ubachs, P.J.H., & I.M.H. Evers (2005): Historische Encyclopedie Maastricht. Walburg Pers, Zutphen. ISBN 905730399X
- Os, Henk van (2000): De weg naar de Hemel. Reliekverering in de Middeleeuwen. Exhibition catalogue Amsterdam and Utrecht. Uitgeverij De Prom, Baarn. ISBN 9068017322
- Various authors (1983): De Sint Servaas, pp. 77-84. Restoration-information bulletin #10 (special edition about the pilgrimage). Stichting Restauratie De Sint Servaas, Maastricht
- Various authors & photographers (2011): Heiligdomsvaart Maastricht 2011 (photo book). Stichting het Graf van Sint Servaas, Maastricht. ISBN 978-90-78213-10-9
