= Holy card =

Christian devotional image

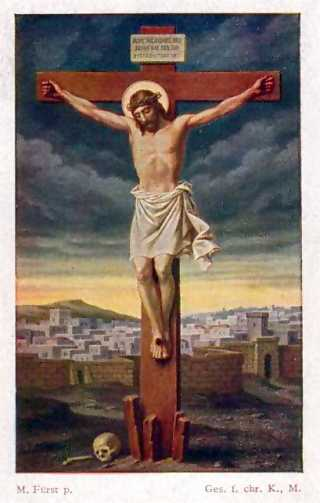
A German holy card (c. 1910) depicting the crucifixion of Jesus

In the Christian tradition, holy cards or prayer cards are small, devotional pictures for the use of the faithful that usually depict a religious scene or a saint in an image about the size of a playing card. The reverse typically contains a prayer, some of which promise an indulgence for its recitation.

The circulation of these cards is an important part of the visual folk culture of Roman Catholics, and in modern times, prayer cards have also become popular among Orthodox Christians and Protestant Christians, although with the latter, biblical themes are emphasized within them.

== Uses ==
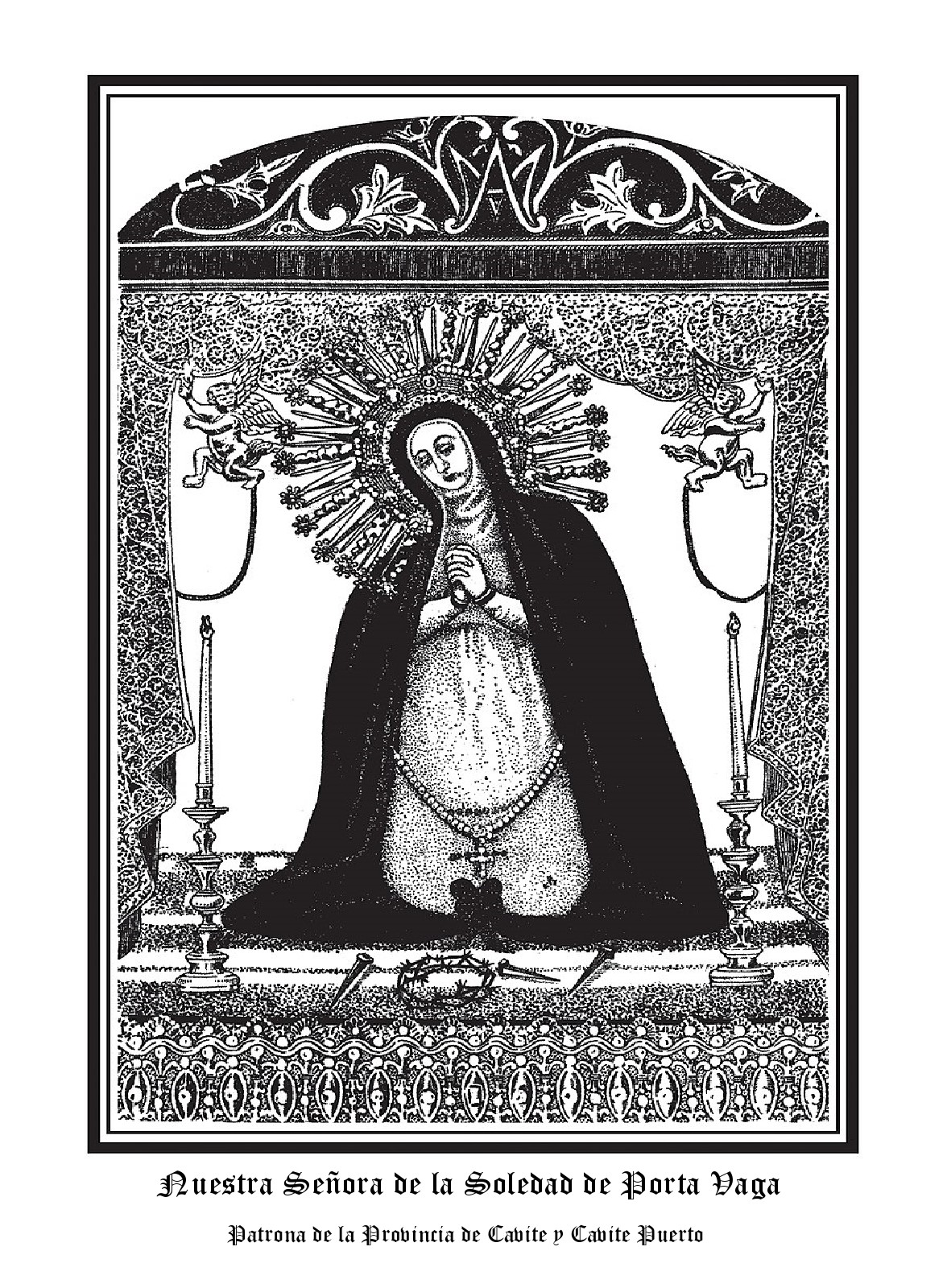
Prayer card of Our Lady of Solitude of Porta Vaga from the Philippines

Most cards are circulated to assist the veneration of the saints and images they bear.

Special holy cards are printed for Catholics to be distributed at funerals by the family of the deceased that include the name and usually dates of birth and death of the deceased. These are a particular type of the in memoriam cards, which can also record other events such as baptisms, confirmations, ordinations, or the making of religious vows.

At the end of the nineteenth century, some Protestants also produced similar images of their own. They produced "Bible cards" or "Sunday school cards", with lithographed illustrations depicting Bible stories and parables, more modern scenes of religious life or prayer, or sometimes just a Biblical text illuminated by calligraphy; these were linked to Biblical passages that related to the image. The reverse typically held a sermonette instead of a prayer. Imagery here was always the servant of text, and as such these Protestant cards tended to be replaced by tracts that emphasized message instead of imagery, and were illustrated with cartoon-like images if they were illustrated at all.

== History ==
=== Old master prints ===
Old master prints, nearly all on religious subjects, served many of the same functions as holy cards, especially the cheaper woodcuts. One early example depicts Saint Christopher with hand-colouring and is estimated to originate sometime between 1435 and 1450. It was found as part of the binding of a manuscript of the Laus Virginis (1417), which belongs to the John Rylands Library, Manchester.

Later, engraving or etching were more commonly used. Some had elaborate borders of paper lace surrounding the images; these were called dévotes dentelles in France.

One use of such cards is illustrated in an early 15th-century painting of the Annunciation by Robert Campin, which stages the event in a bourgeois home; above the fireplace, a print of Christopher carrying the Christ child is tacked to the wall, possibly as a more affordable alternative to a painting.

=== Lithography ===
The invention of chromolithography made it possible to reproduce coloured images cheaply, leading to a much broader circulation of the cards. An early centre of their manufacture was in the environs of the Church of St Sulpice in Paris; the lithographed images made there were done in delicate pastel colours, and proved extremely influential in later designs.

Belgium and Germany also became centres of the manufacture of holy cards, as did Italy in the twentieth century. Catholic printing houses (such as Maison de la Bonne Presse in France and Ars Sacra in Germany) produced large numbers of cards, and often a single design was printed by different companies in different countries.

=== Recent history ===
The 1940 Head of Christ painting has been printed more than 500 million times, including pocket-sized cards for carrying in a wallet. In the World War II era, "millions of cards featuring the Head of Christ were distributed through the USO by the Salvation Army and the YMCA to members of the American armed forces stationed overseas."

During the Cold War, both Catholics and Protestants helped to popularize these cards, presenting "a united front against the menace of godless Communism".

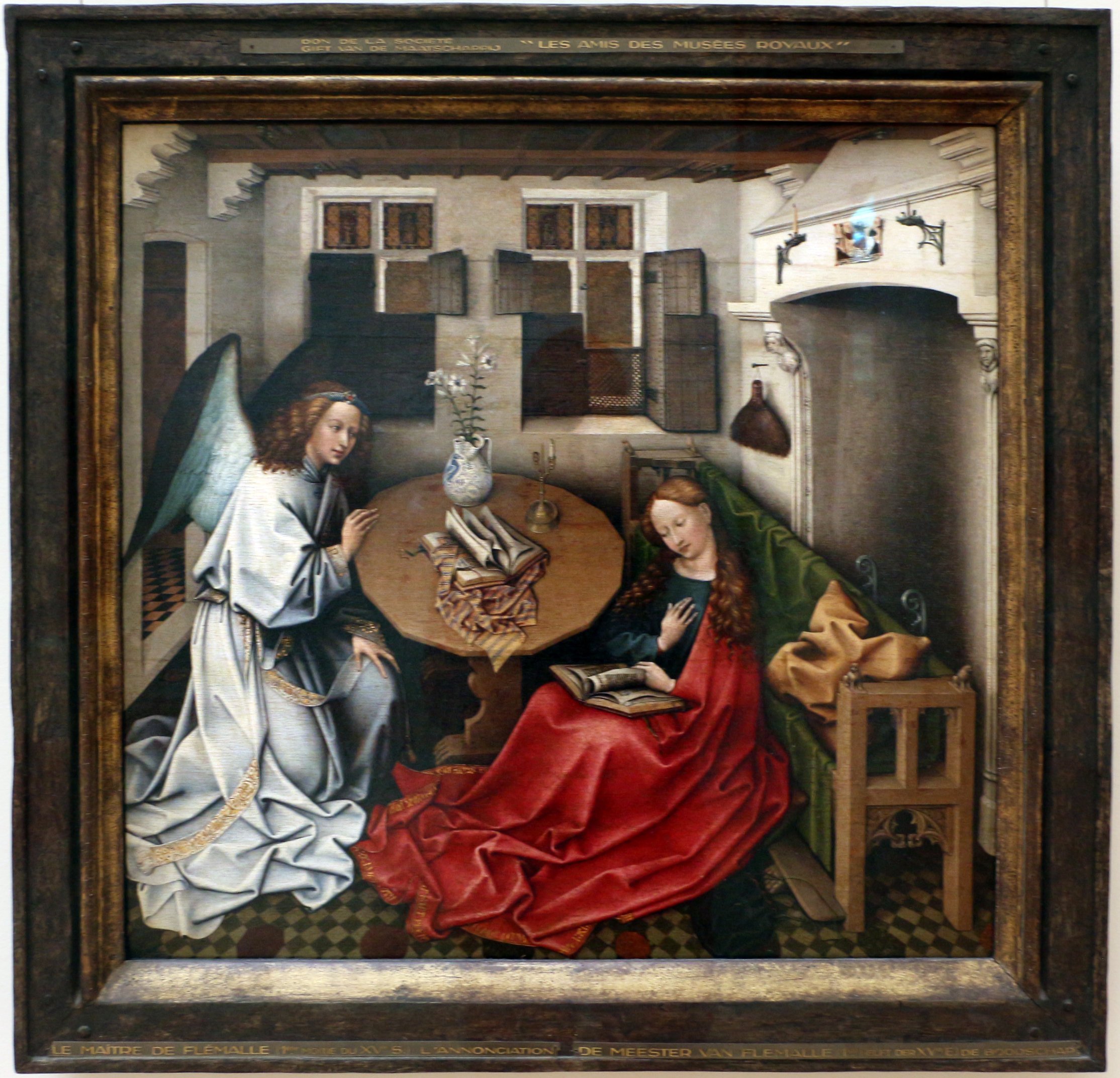
Annunciation by Robert Campin; a wood print is in the top right, between candle fixtures.

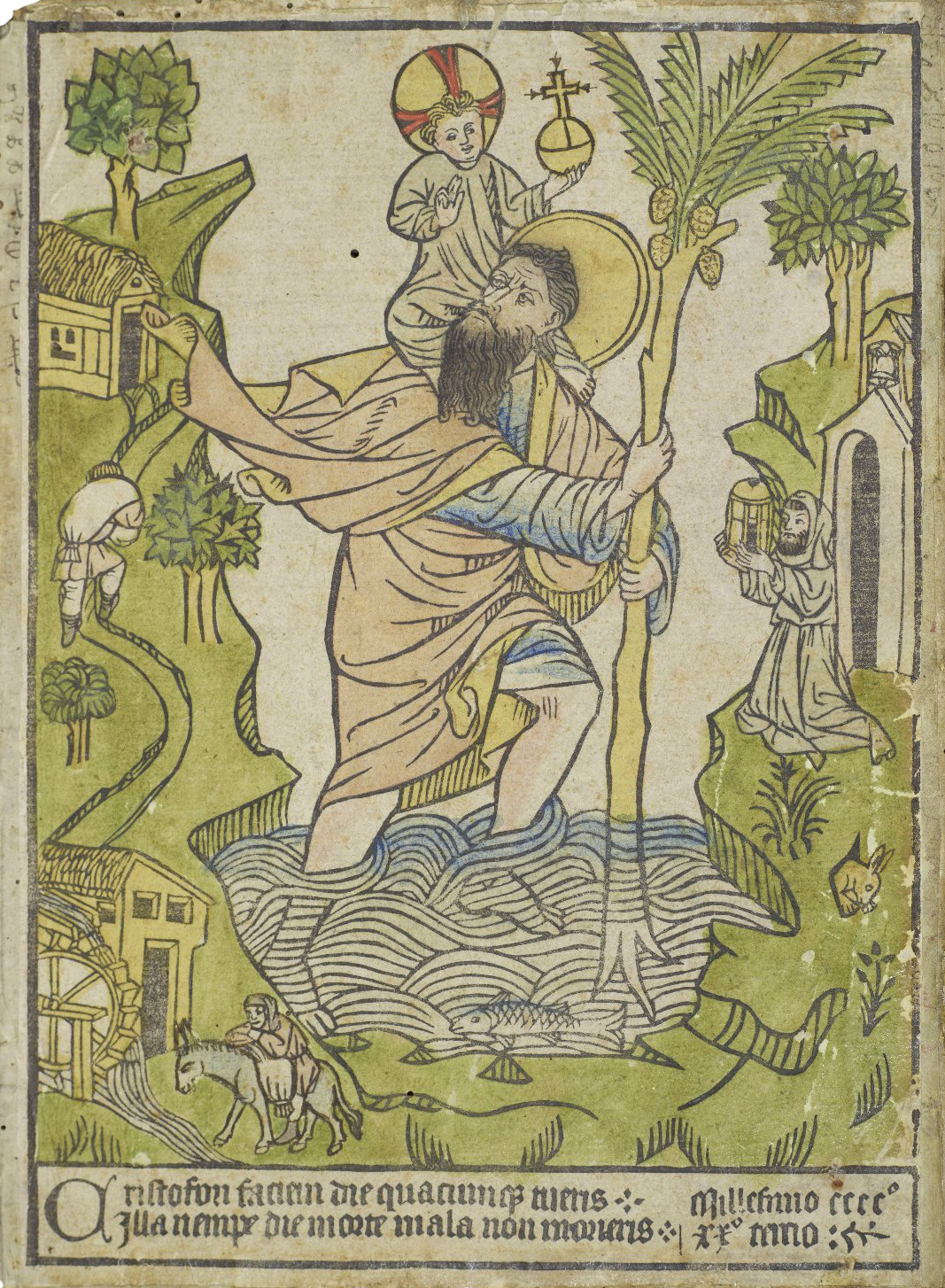
Saint Christopher holy card, c. 1435-1450, Buxheim, with hand-colouring

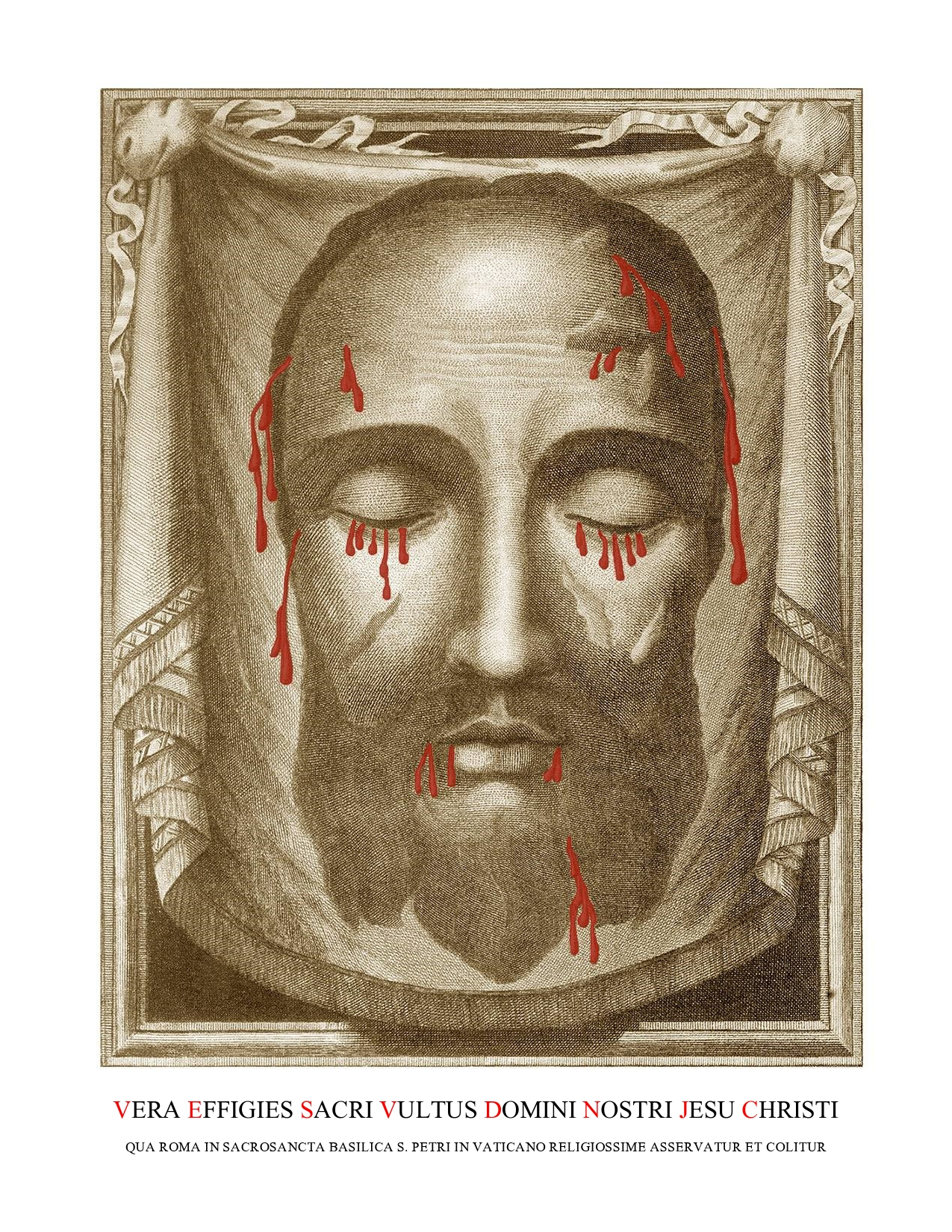
Prayer card of the Holy Face of Jesus

== Collecting ==
Holy cards are popular collectible items. They are small and inexpensive and can be stored safely in plastic sleeves in a binder. Holy card collecting is mostly popular in Catholic countries. Some collectors base their collection on various criteria like a favorite saint, country of issue, issuer, etc.

== See also ==
- Andachtsbilder
- Icon
- Saint symbolism
