= Aert van Tricht =

Dutch sculptor (fl. 1492–1501)

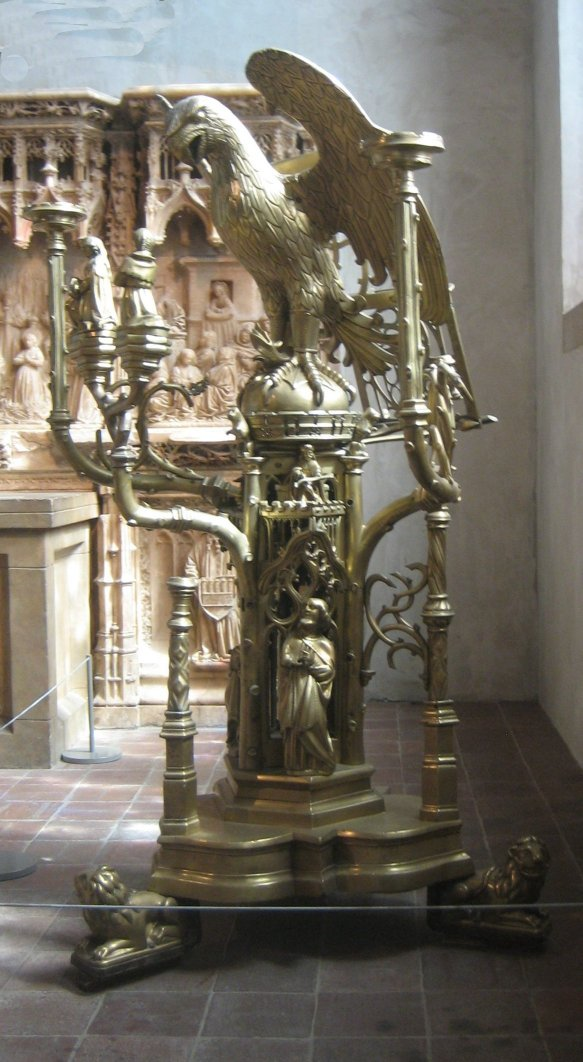
Brass lectern in the form of an eagle attributed to Aert van Tricht, Limburg (Netherlands), c. 1500, The Cloisters

Aert van Tricht was a Dutch metal-caster active in Maastricht between 1492 and 1501, in Antwerp in 1521 (?). He is sometimes called Aert van Tricht the Elder to distinguish him from his son. His known works include the following:

- Seven-branched candelabra for the Franciscan monastery in Maastricht, 1492, now lost
- Brass font for St. John's Cathedral in 's-Hertogenbosch, 1492
- Copper railings for the Brotherhood Chapel of St. John's Cathedral in 's-Hertogenbosch, based on wooden models made by Alart du Hameel, 1495-6
- Eagle lectern, originally in St. Peter's Church, Leuven, now in The Cloisters, New York City, c. 1500
- Arched candelabrum used as a choir screen of Xanten Cathedral, 1501
- Bronze tabernacle in Bocholt Church in Bocholt, Belgium, undated
- Brass font, originally in St Nicolas'Church in Maastricht, now in the Basilica of Our Lady, Maastricht, undated and severely damaged (stripped of all ornaments)
