= Mourning stationery =

Black-bordered stationery

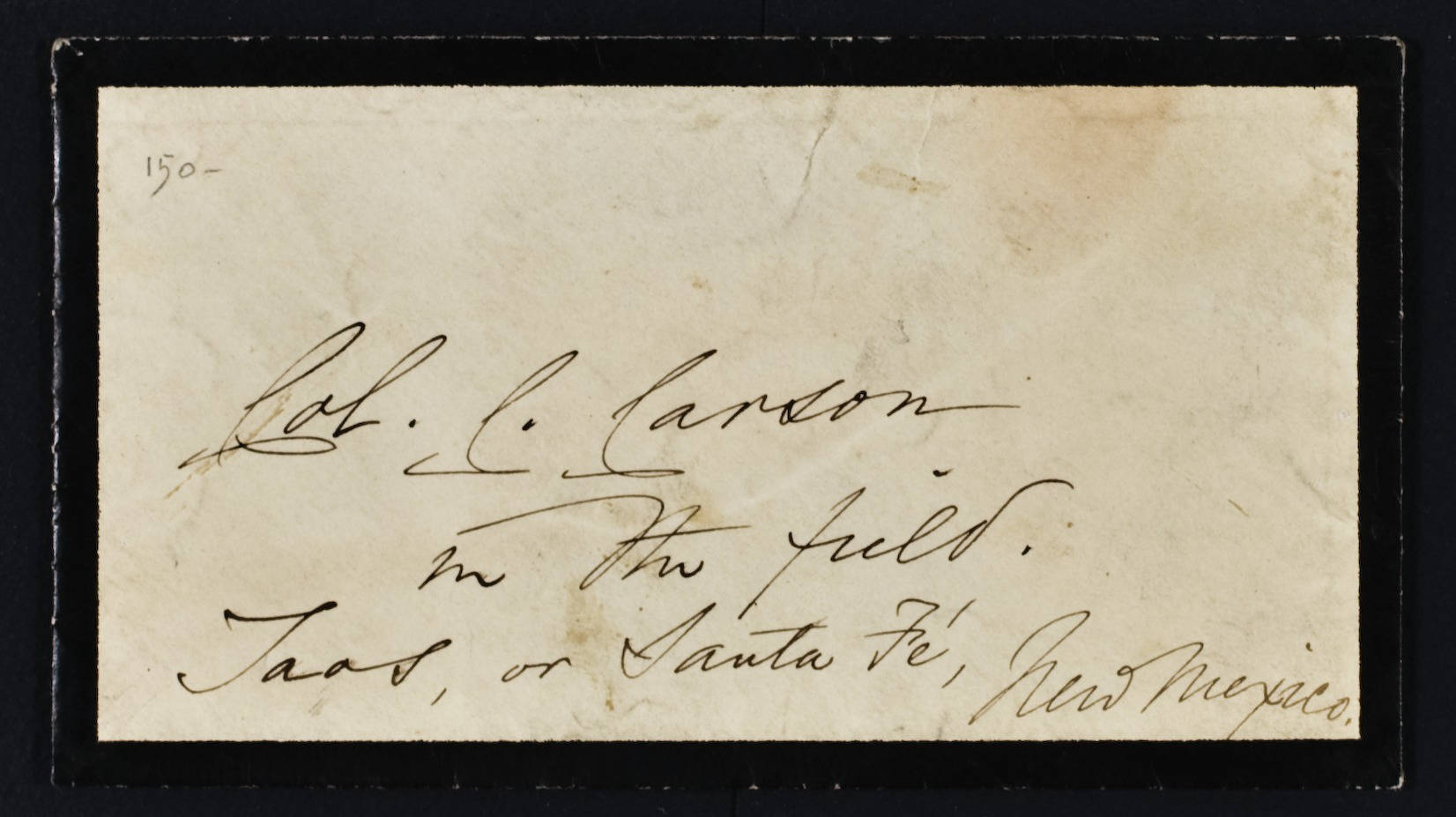
Letter with a mourning border c. 1861

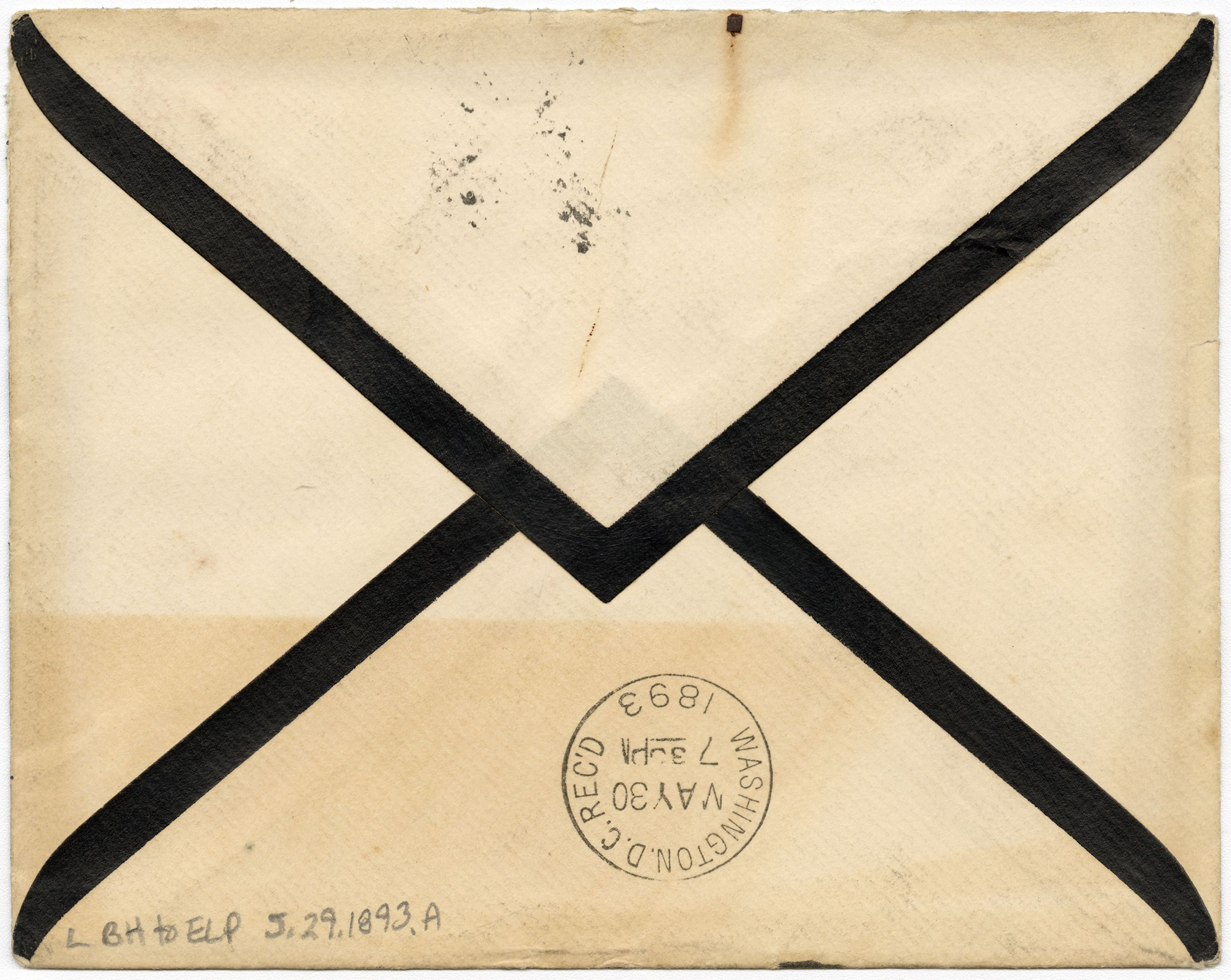
Back of envelope with mourning border, 1893

Mourning stationery is a letter, envelope, or calling card with a black border, used to signify that a person is in mourning. It was first used in the 17th century in Europe and was most popular during the Victorian era, during which it was also used in the United States and West Africa.

The border may start thick and thin over time, or the thickness may depend on the level of bereavement, or both. For example, the death of a child may call for a thicker border than the death of a cousin. Social norms expected that the mourning period was to be displayed in both public and private. After the death of a reigning monarch, a mourning border may be placed on public notices, newspapers, and other government stationery.

Convention was that children did not use mourning stationery. If seals are used with mourning stationery, they are conventionally black. Black borders may also be used on letters announcing an execution.

== History ==
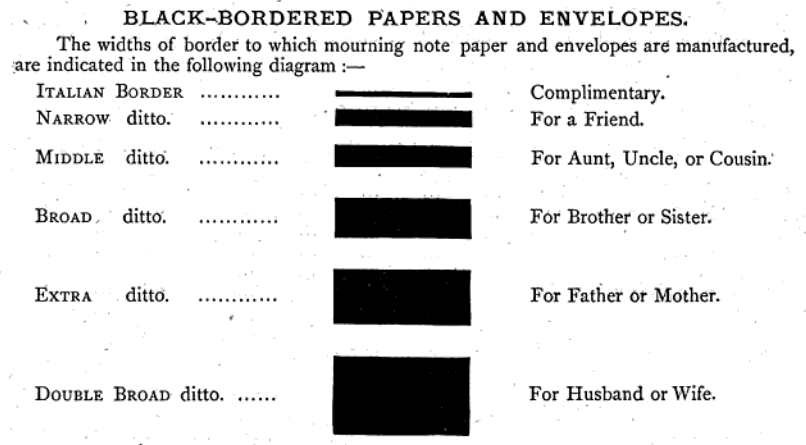
Wyman's Dictionary of Stationery (1875) on the width of black borders according to degrees of kinship

Upon the death of Queen Victoria in 1901, mourning stationery was sold in many stores to honour her.

Nineteenth-century American newspapers used a black border when announcing a death.

After the death of Prince Philip, Duke of Edinburgh in 2021, Queen Elizabeth II chose not to use the black border to signify mourning (opting instead to use her royal coat of arms printed in black rather than red on correspondence), although she did use it once as a final note to Philip. This was a break in tradition which started in 1861 by Queen Victoria after the death of Prince Albert. Despite Queen Elizabeth's break from tradition, Prince Charles (now King) and Camilla continued to use the mourning border.

== Appearances in works of art ==
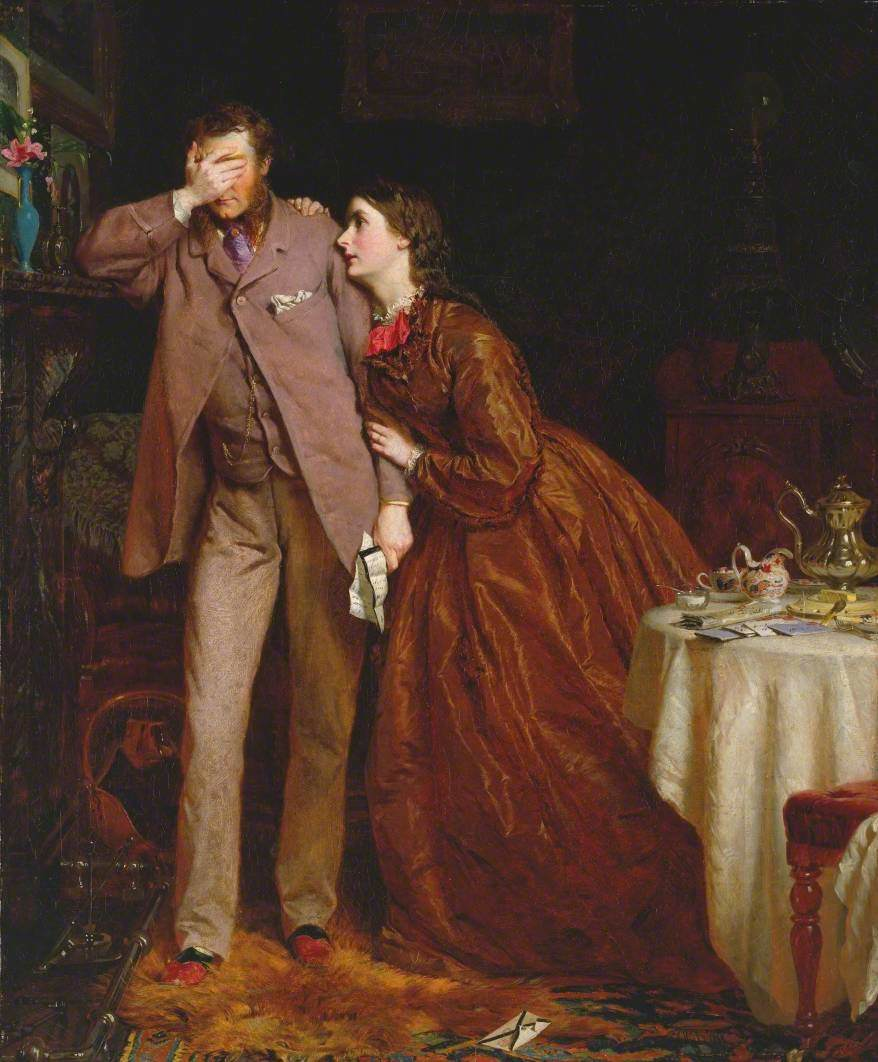
Mourning stationery - specifically, a black-edged letter and envelope - in a painting by George Elgar Hicks

A black-bordered letter makes appearance in George Elgar Hicks' 1863 painting, Woman’s Mission: Companion of Manhood.

A black-bordered letter is the subject of traditional blues song Death Letter Blues.

== See also ==
- In memoriam card
