= Onze Lieve Vrouweplein =

Square in Maastricht, the Netherlands

Coordinates: 50.8475°N 5.6930°E

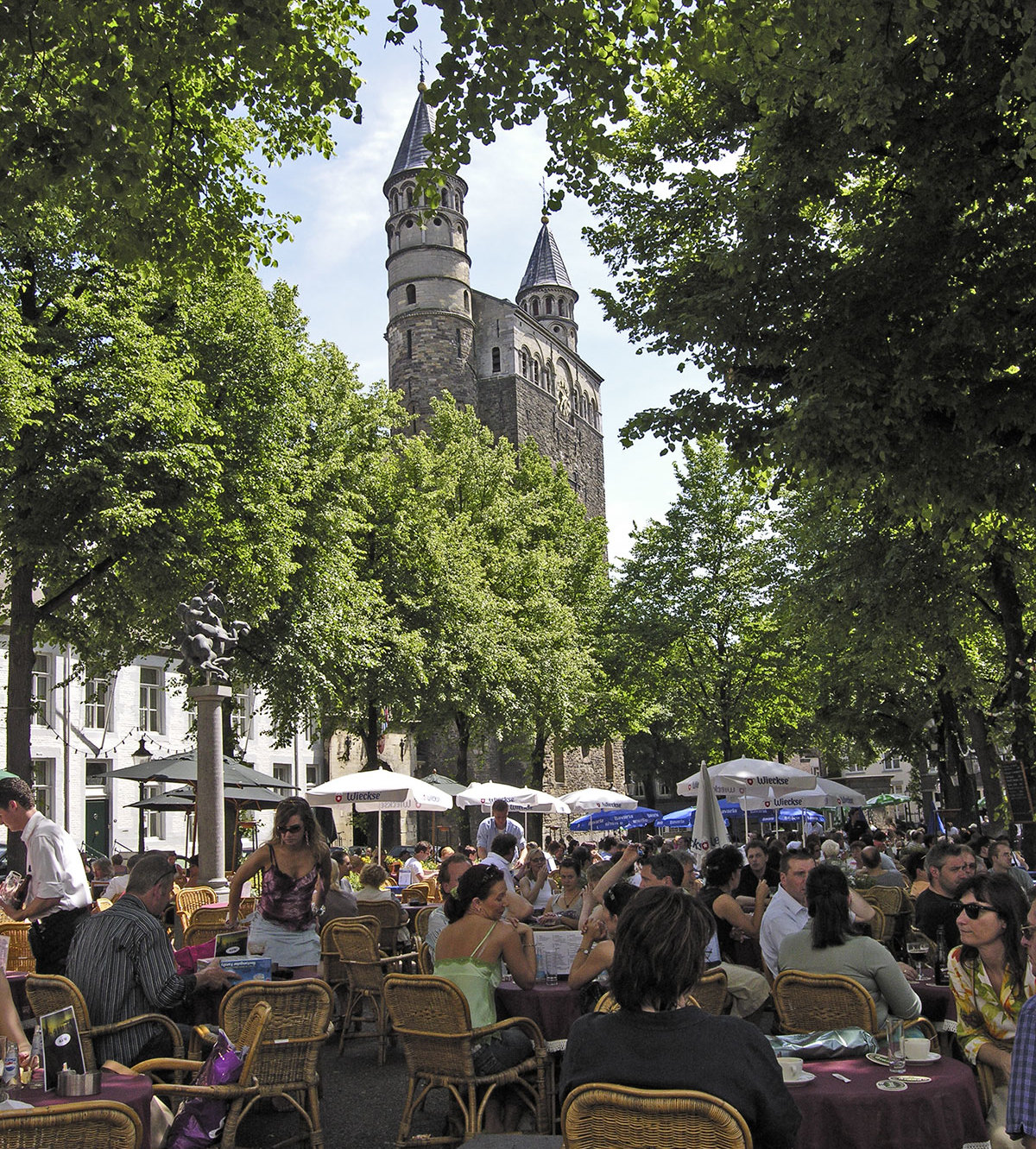
Onze Lieve Vrouweplein

The Onze Lieve Vrouweplein (Dutch: [ˌɔnzə ˌlivə ˈvrʌu.əˌplɛin]; Limburgish: Slevrouweplein [sləˈvʀɔwəˌplɛːn˦]; "Square of Our Lady") is a square in the historic center of Maastricht, the Netherlands. The square is situated south of Maastricht's pedestrianised shopping district. Well known for its many café terraces, it is a popular place with tourists and local people alike.

The Onze Lieve Vrouweplein was originally named Onze-Lieve-Vrouwekerkhof, because it was the churchyard of the Basilica of Our Lady and the neighbouring parish church of Saint Nicholas (demolished in 1838). The Romanesque Basilica of Our Lady is famous for the statue of Our Lady, Star of the Sea, the 12th-century figurative capitals in the choir ambulatory, and the church treasury (Schatkamer Onze-Lieve-Vrouwebasiliek).

In 1986, remains were discovered of a 2nd-century AD Jupiter column as part of an enclosed shrine, as well as the remnants of a former Roman castrum dating back to c. 313 AD. The preserved archaeological excavations can be visited in the basement of Hotel Derlon (Museumkelder Derlon; free of charge, after obtaining permission from the hotel staff).

The European Institute of Public Administration (EIPA), an EU-affiliated independent institute carrying out training and research on public administration and European policies, is located at Onze Lieve Vrouweplein. Until 1986 it occupied the so-called House with the Pelican, an Art Nouveau former bank building. Since 1986 it is based in a former canon's house nearby (Onze Lieve Vrouweplein 22) and several modern premises in the courtyard of that building. The House with the Pelican became the main office for the European Centre for Development Policy Management.

== Sources ==
- Sterre der Zee (Dutch)
