= In memoriam card =

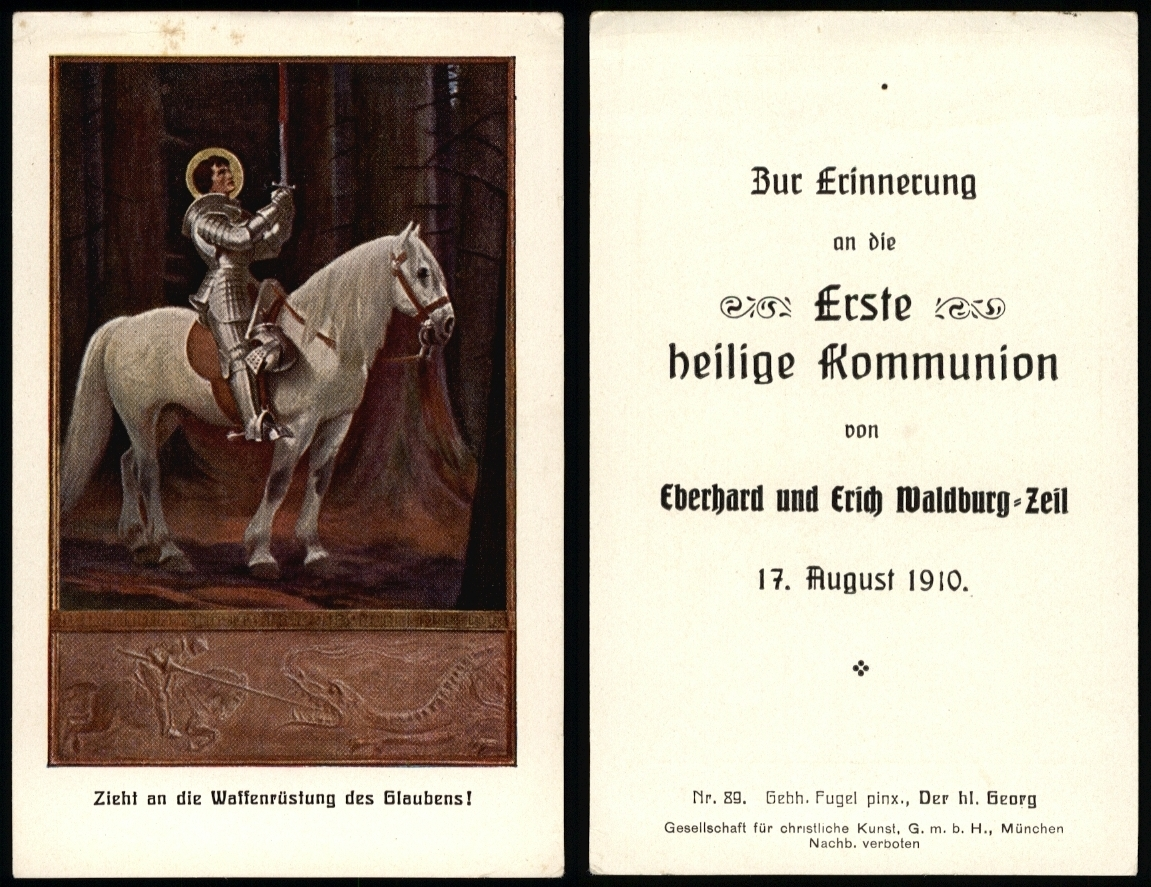
In memoriam card for the first holy communion of two boys in 1910. The picture shows a young knight, the imprint is a quote of Saint Paul: "Put on the full armor of God!"

An In memoriam card is a Christian devotional image that is printed on its back as a commemoration for certain events such as the receiving the sacrament of the first holy communion, the making of solemn vows, the bestowal of holy orders or the consecration of virgins, and their major anniversaries. It often also includes a prayer, a quotation from the Bible and dates regarding the given event. Special forms of the in memoriam cards are Osterbilder and Sterbebildchen as well as in memoriam cards collected and blessed at a place of pilgrimage.

== History ==
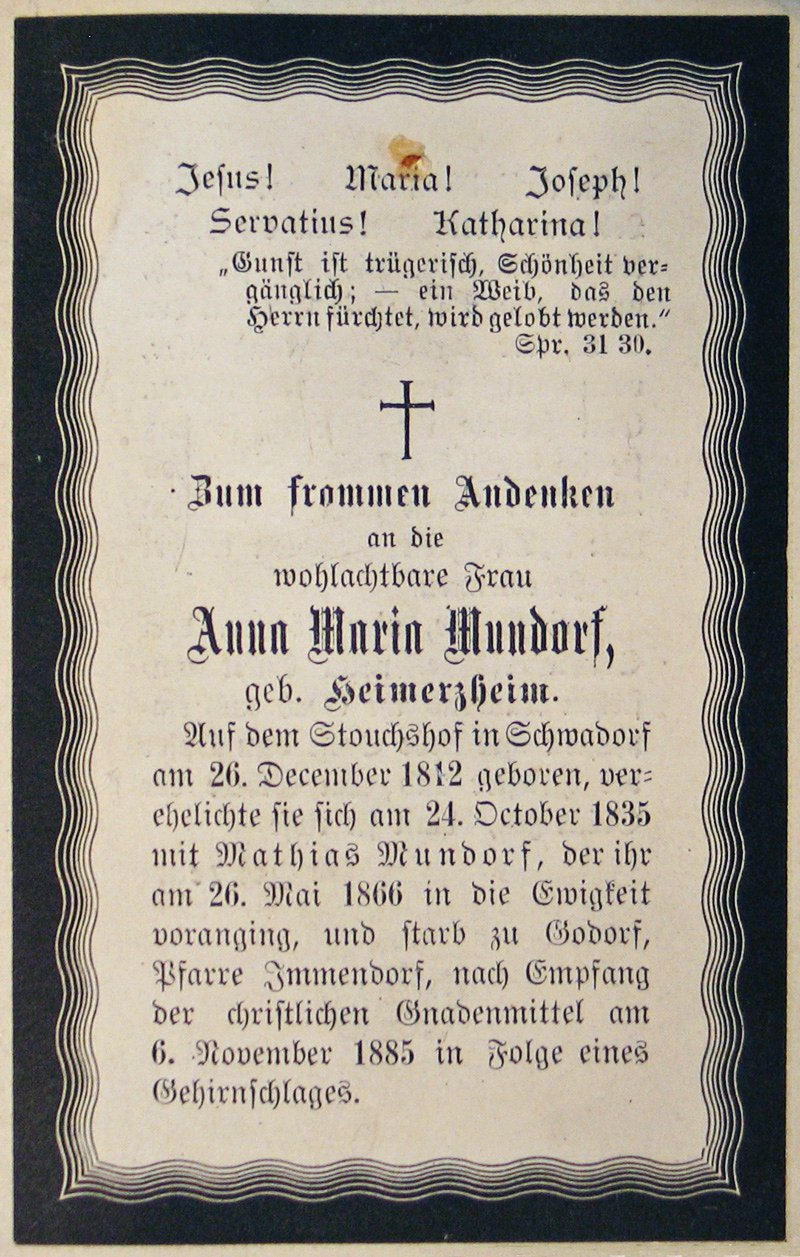
Example of a German Totenzettel from Rhineland, 1885. Apart from a quote of the Book of Proverbs it contains a short summary of the major dates of the life and death of the deceased.

New Year wishes are among the oldest motifs of small devotional pictures and appear as monastic friendship gifts as early as the Middle Ages. So-called Osterbildchen or Osterbilder ("Easter pictures") occurred for the first time at the end of the 17th century and derive from the Baroque period. They were handed every year to the communicants in the Easter vigil and during Eastertide. This custom is still common.

In German-speaking Catholic regions, in memoriam cards are also manufactured on the occasion of the announcement of a death in the family (called Totenbildchen, Totenzettel, Sterbebild, in Austria also Parte, in a larger size), combined with the request for prayers. Nowadays, the cards always include a photo of the deceased. Usually they are handed or sent to people who attended the Requiem Mass and the sepulture or have offered their sympathies to the family. Wealthy families commissioned such pictures already before 1900. Ordinary citizens could not afford such expenses until the 1930s. In the course of the 1940s, only a few citizens refrained from having in memoriam cards printed and only when they did not have the financial means to do so.

== Gallery ==
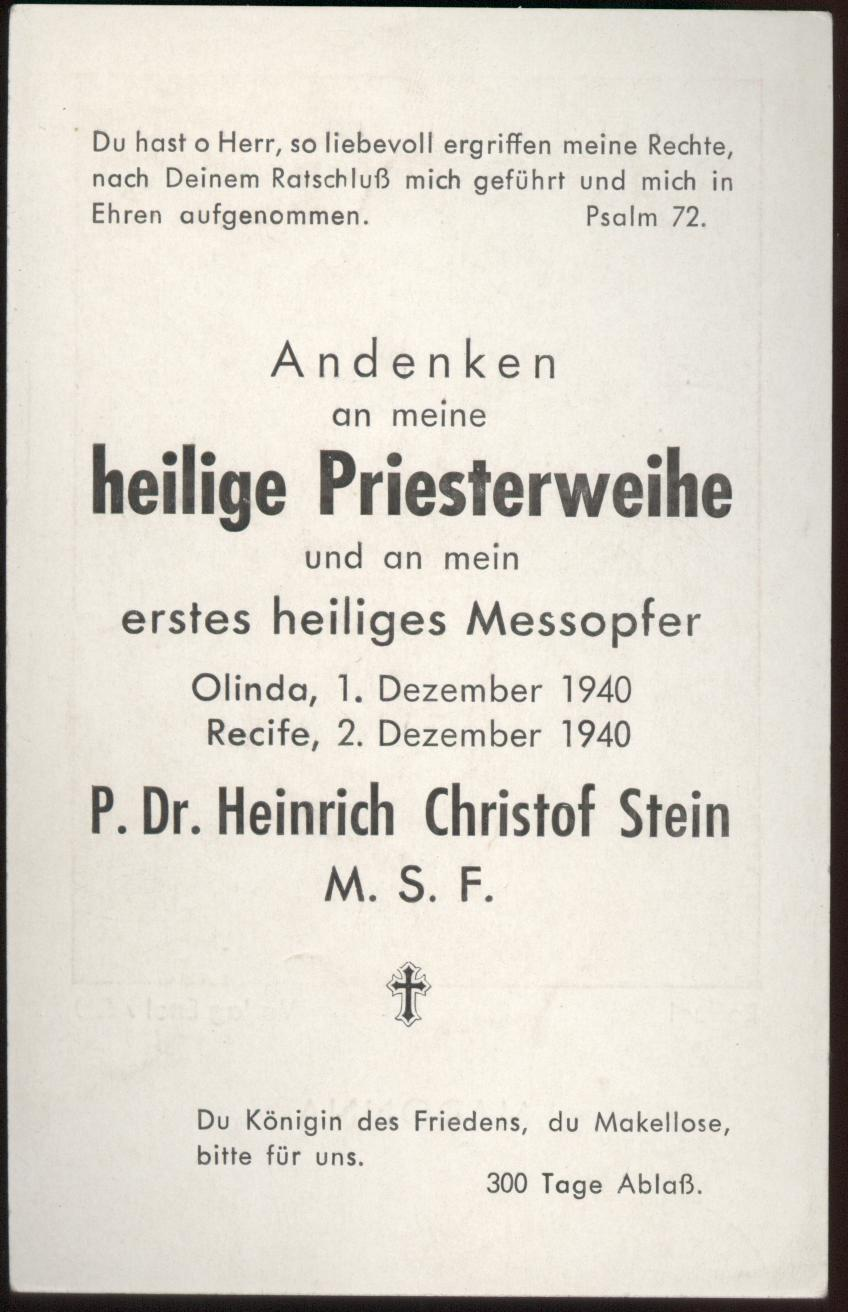
Reverse side of the in memoriam card for the ordination to priesthood and the first mass of a member of the Congregatio Missionariorum a Sancta Familia in 1940

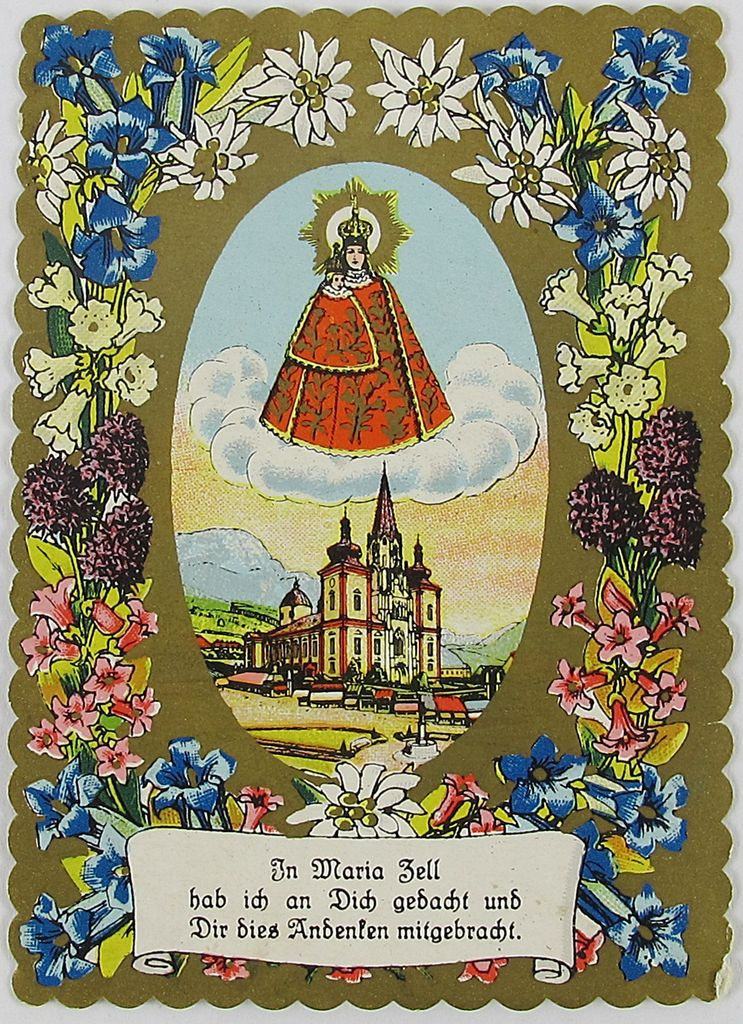
In memoriam card as a keepsake from a pilgrimage to the Austrian Mariazell from the 19th century

== See also ==
- Holy card
- Mourning stationery
