= Maastricht =

City and municipality in Limburg, Netherlands

Maastricht Mestreech (Limburgish)
- City and municipality
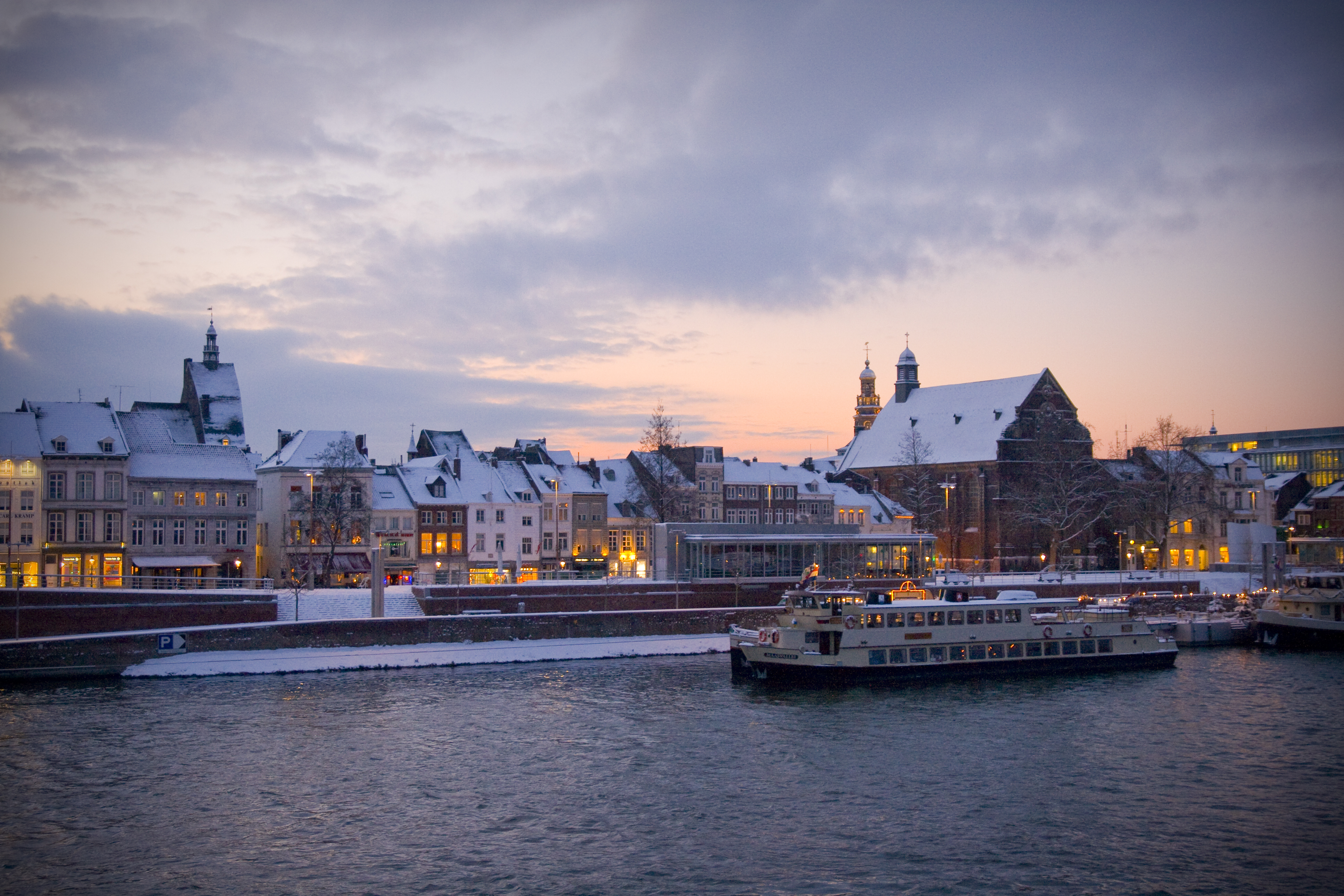
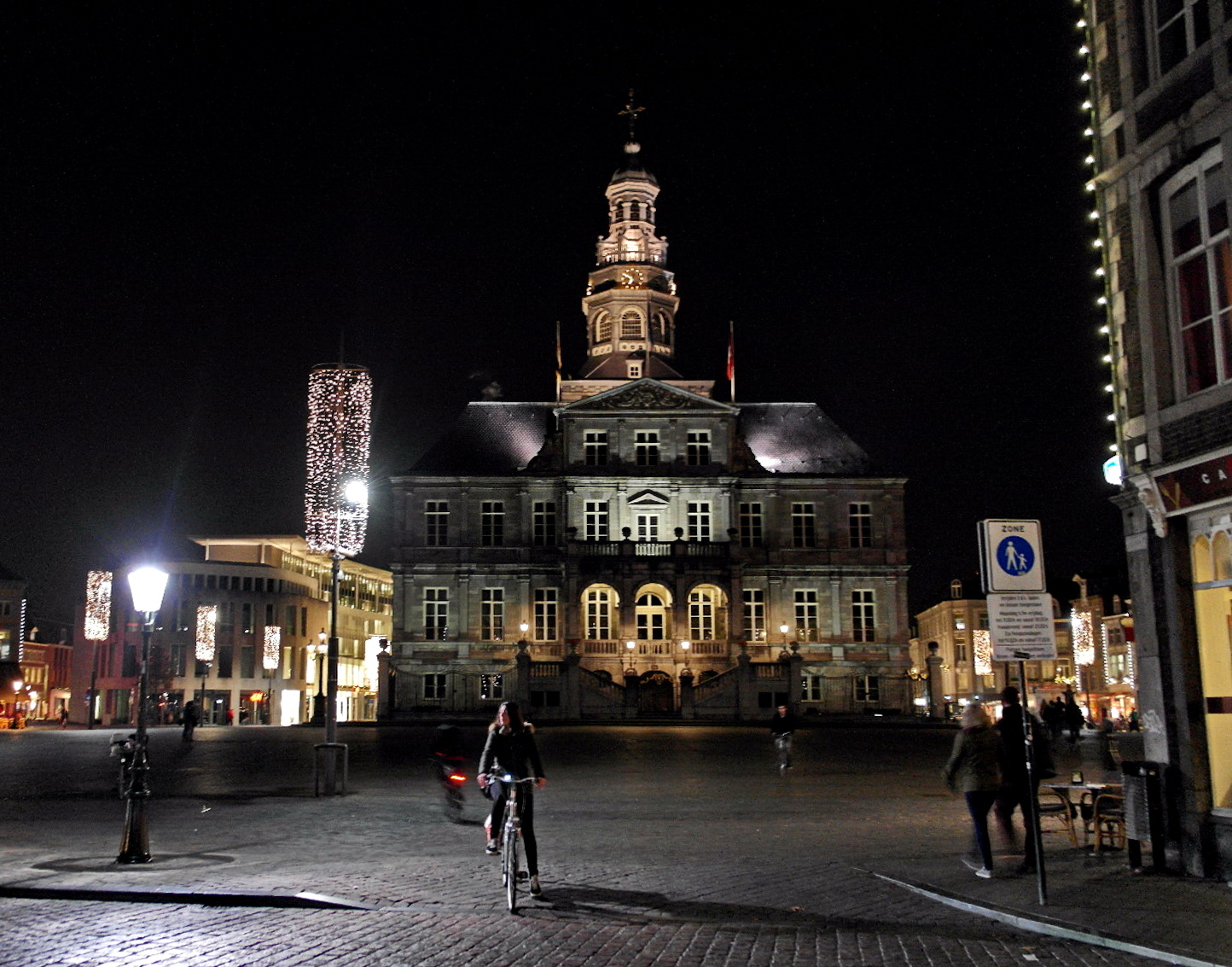
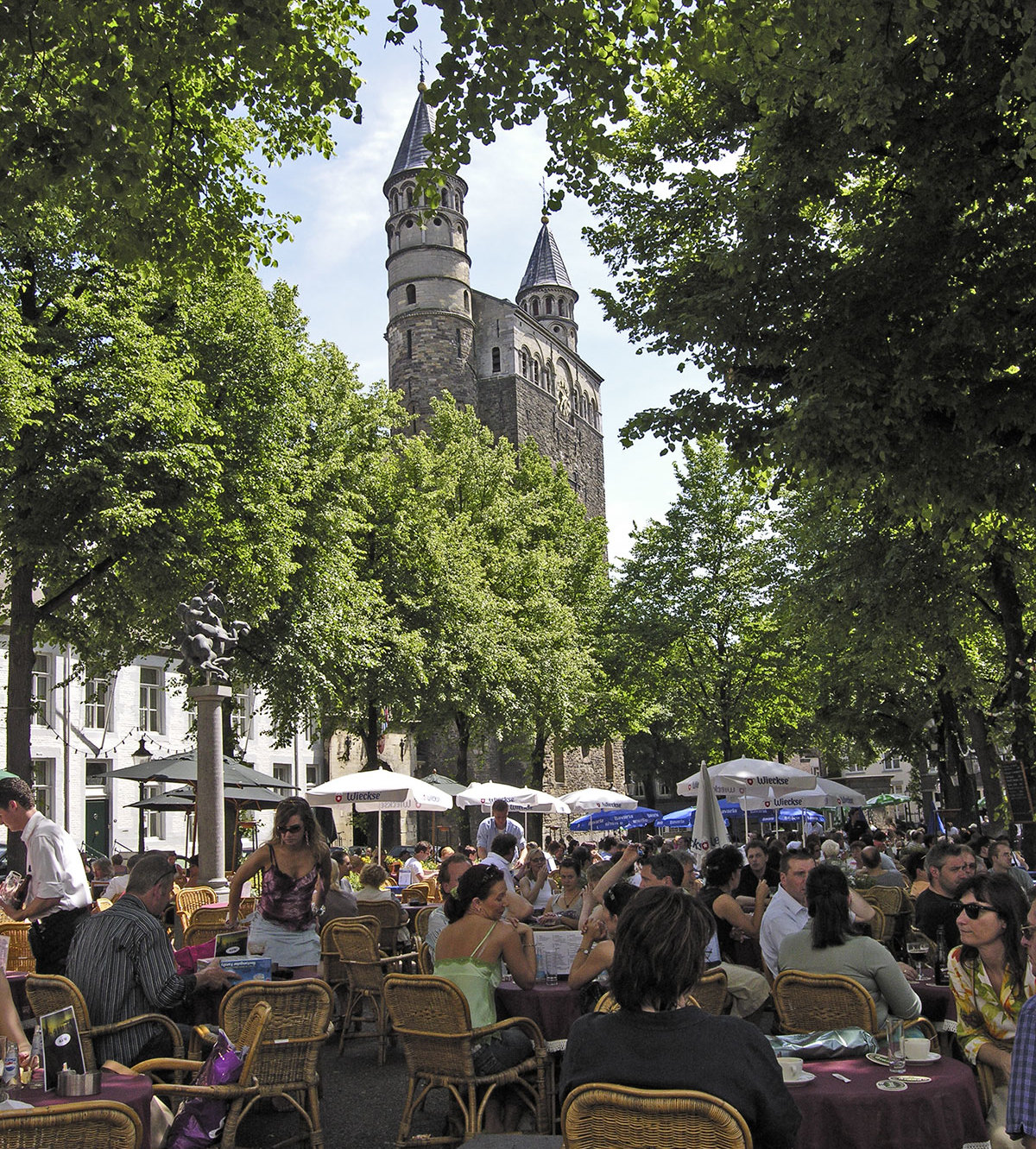
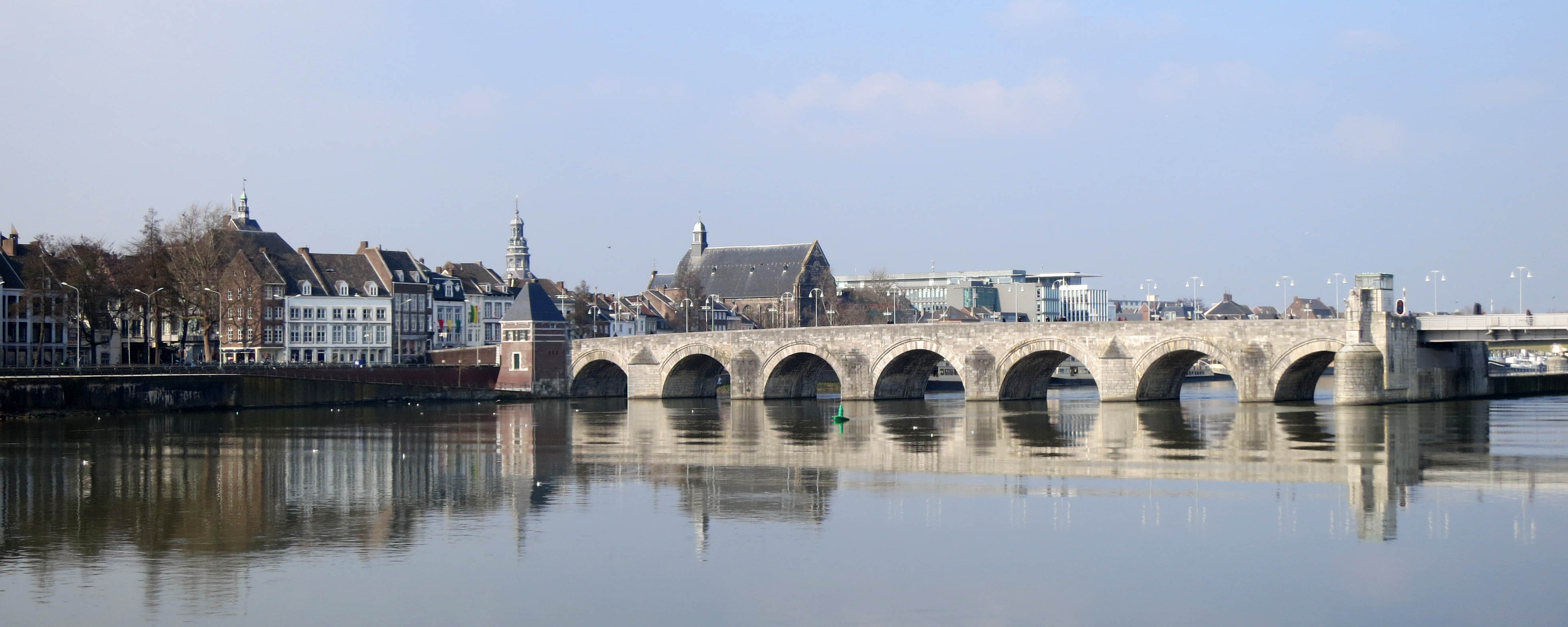
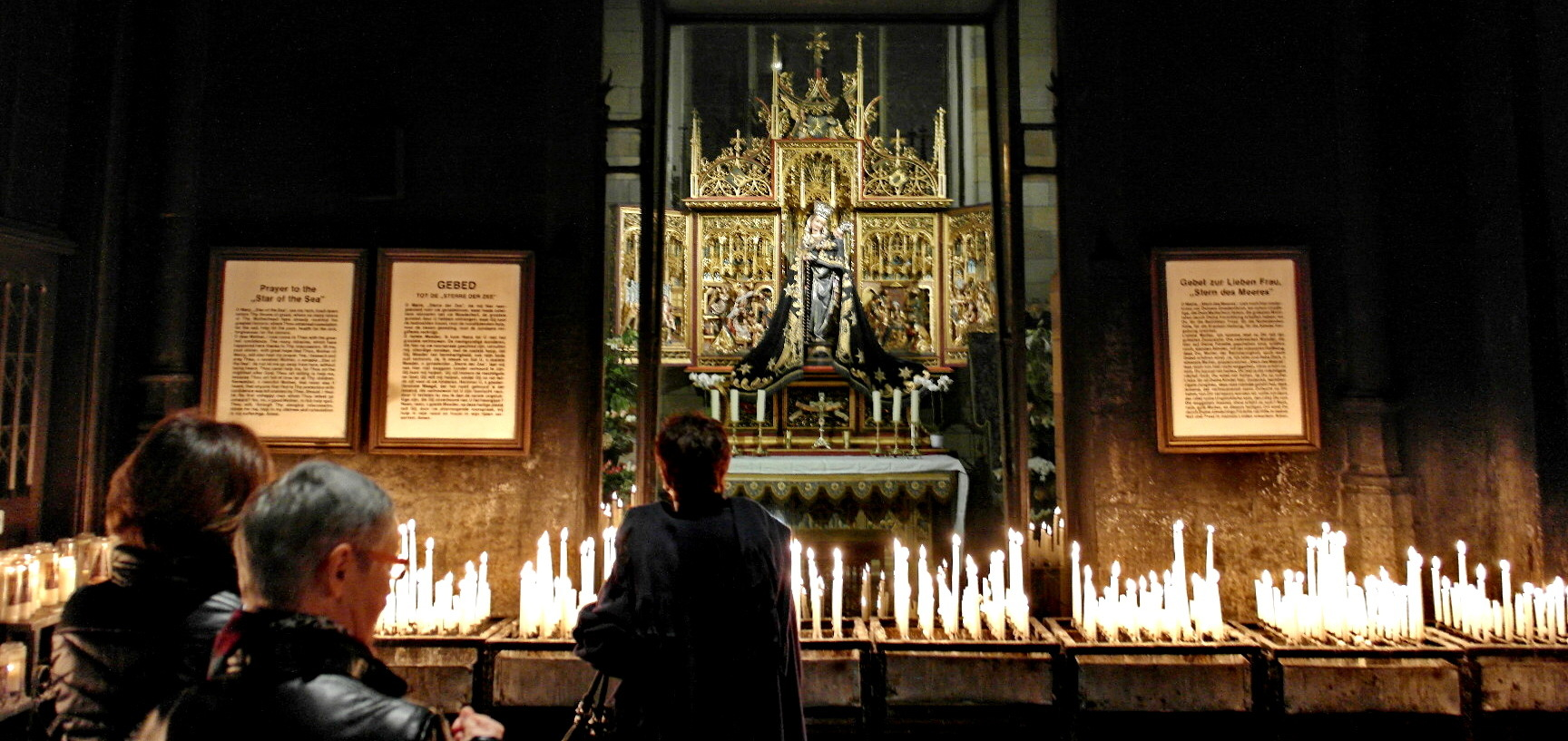
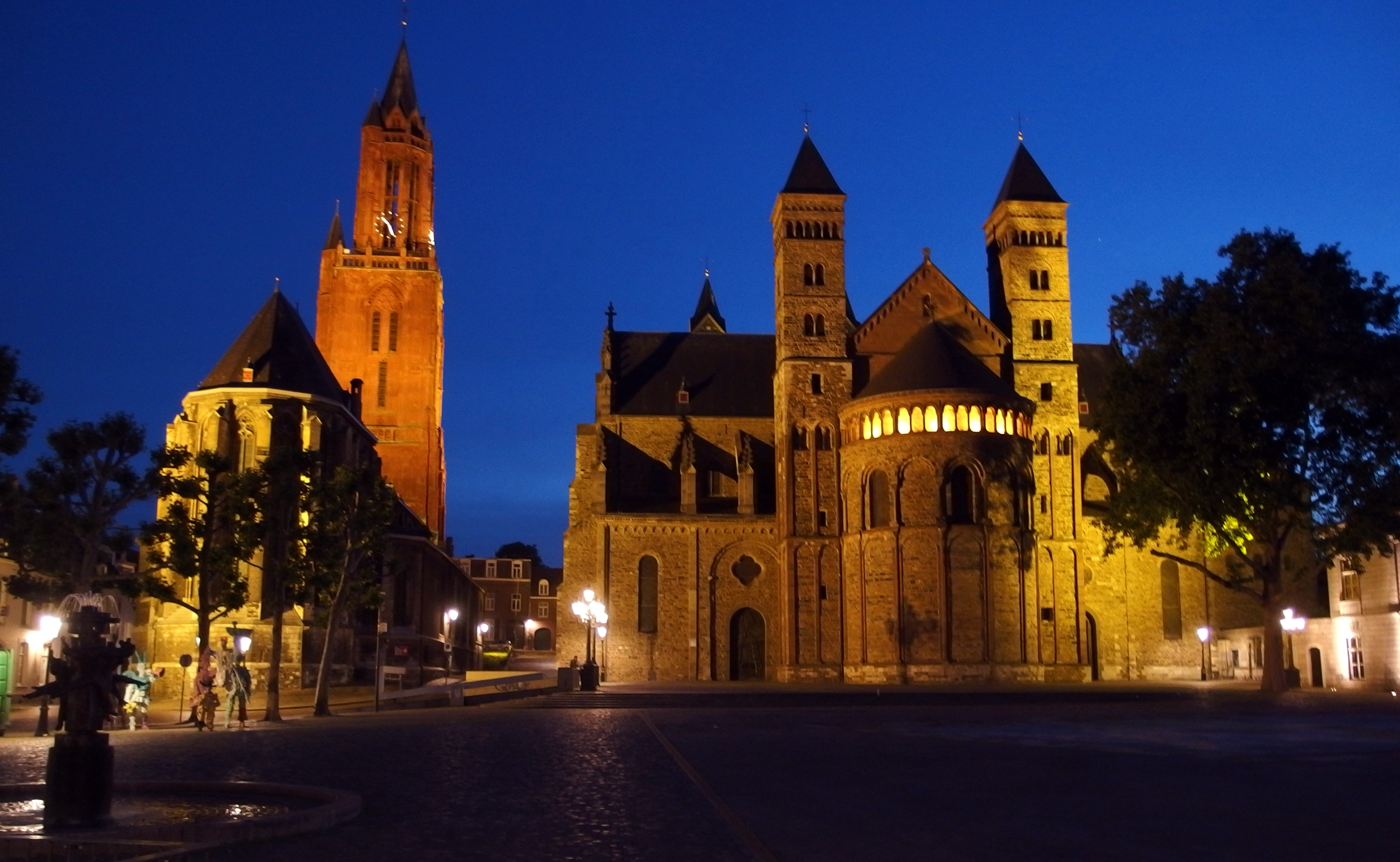
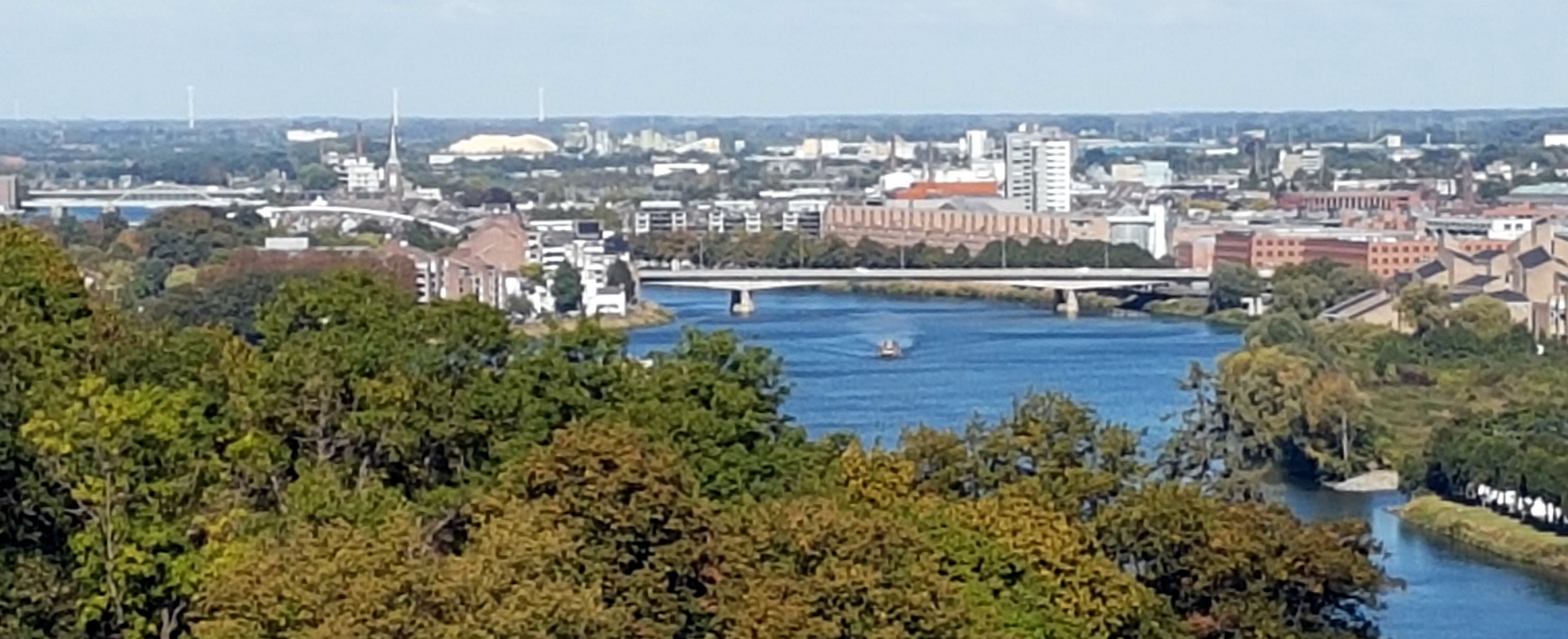
- River Meuse in winter Maastricht City Hall at night Sidewalk cafés at Onze Lieve Vrouweplein Saint Servatius Bridge Our Lady, Star of the Sea chapel St. John's and St. Servatius' churches at Vrijthof square View from Mount Saint Peter

- Flag Coat of arms Logo
- Anthem: Mestreechs Volksleed
- Location in Limburg

- Location within the Netherlands Location within Europe
- Coordinates: 50°51′N 5°41′E
- Country: Netherlands
- Province: Limburg
- Settled: c. 50 AD
- City rights: gradually acquired
- City Hall: Maastricht City Hall
- Boroughs: 7 districts: Centrum (Binnenstad, Jekerkwartier, Kommelkwartier, Statenkwartier, Boschstraatkwartier, Sint Maartenspoort, Wyck-Céramique); Noordoost (Beatrixhaven, Borgharen, Itteren, Meerssenhoven); Oost (Wyckerpoort, Wittevrouwenveld, Nazareth, Limmel, Amby, Scharn, Heugemerveld); Zuidoost (Randwyck, Heugem, Heer, De Heeg, Vroendaal); Zuidwest (Villapark, Jekerdal, Biesland, Campagne, Wolder, Sint Pieter); West (Brusselsepoort, Mariaberg, Belfort, Pottenberg, Malpertuis, Caberg, Malberg, Dousberg-Hazendans, Daalhof); Noordwest (Boschpoort, Bosscherveld, Frontenkwartier, Belvédère, Lanakerveld)

Government
  - Body: Municipal council
  - Mayor: Wim Hillenaar (CDA)

Area
  - Municipality: 60.12 km^{2} (23.21 sq mi)
  - Land: 55.99 km^{2} (21.62 sq mi)
  - Water: 4.13 km^{2} (1.59 sq mi)
- Elevation: 49 m (161 ft)

Population (Municipality, January 2021; Urban and Metro, May 2014)
  - Municipality: 120,227
  - Density: 2,147/km^{2} (5,560/sq mi)
  - Urban: 277,721
  - Metro: ≈ 3,500,000
- Urban population for Dutch-Belgian region; metropolitan population for Dutch-Belgian-German region.
- Demonyms: (Dutch) Maastrichtenaar; (Limb.) Mestreechteneer or "Sjeng" (nickname)
- Time zone: UTC+1 (CET)
  - Summer (DST): UTC+2 (CEST)
- Postcode: 6200–6229
- Area code: 043
- Website: www.gemeentemaastricht.nl/en

Maastricht (/ˈmɑːstrɪxt/ MAH-strikht, US also /mɑːˈstrɪxt/ mah-STRIKHT, Dutch: [maːˈstrɪxt]; Limburgish: Mestreech [məˈstʀeːx]) is a city and a municipality in the southeastern Netherlands. It is the capital and largest city of the province of Limburg. Maastricht is located on both sides of the Meuse (Dutch: Maas), at the point where the river is joined by the Jeker. Mount Saint Peter (Sint-Pietersberg) is largely situated within the city's municipal borders. Maastricht is adjacent to the border with Belgium and is part of the Meuse-Rhine Euroregion, an international metropolis with a population of about 3.9 million, which includes the nearby German and Belgian cities of Aachen, Liège, and Hasselt.

Maastricht developed from a Roman settlement (Trajectum ad Mosam) to a medieval river trade and religious centre. In the 16th century it became a garrison town and in the 19th century an early industrial centre. Today, the city is a thriving cultural and regional hub. It became well known through the Maastricht Treaty and as the birthplace of the euro. Maastricht has 1,677 national heritage buildings (rijksmonumenten), the second highest number in the Netherlands, after Amsterdam. The city is visited by tourists for shopping and recreation, and has a large international student population.

== History ==
=== Toponymy ===
Maastricht is mentioned in ancient documents as [Ad] Treiectinsem [urbem] ab. 575, Treiectensis in 634, Triecto, Triectu in 7th century, Triiect in 768–781, Traiecto in 945, Masetrieth in 1051.

The place name Maastricht is an Old Dutch compound Masa- (> Maas "the Meuse river") + Old Dutch *treiekt, itself borrowed from Gallo-Romance *TRA(I)ECTU cf. its Walloon name li trek, from Classical Latin trajectus ("ford, passage, place to cross a river") with the later addition of Maas "Meuse" to avoid the confusion with the -trecht of Utrecht having exactly the same original form and etymology. The Latin name first appears in medieval documents and it is not known whether *Trajectu(s) was Maastricht's name during Roman times.

A resident of Maastricht is referred to as Maastrichtenaar while in the local dialect it is either Mestreechteneer or, colloquially, Sjeng (derived from the formerly popular French name Jean).

=== Early history ===
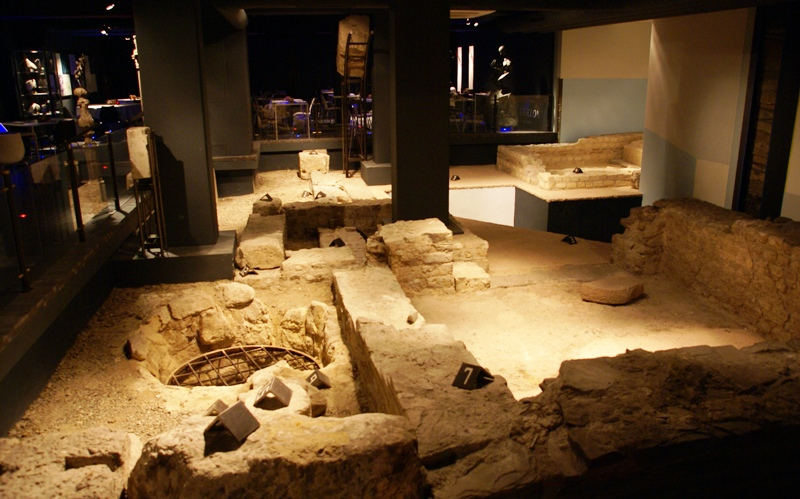
Roman sanctuary in the basement of Hotel Derlon

Neanderthal remains have been found to the west of Maastricht (Belvédère excavations). Of a later date are Palaeolithic remains, between 8,000 and 25,000 years old. Celts lived here around 500 BC, at a spot where the river Meuse was shallow and therefore easy to cross.

It is not known when the Romans arrived in Maastricht, nor whether the settlement was founded by them. The Romans built a bridge across the Meuse in the 1st century AD, during the reign of Augustus Caesar. The bridge was an important link in the main road between Bavay and Cologne. Roman Maastricht was relatively small. Remains of the Roman road, the bridge, a religious shrine, a Roman bath, a granary, some houses and the 4th-century castrum walls and gates, have been excavated. Fragments of provincial Roman sculptures, as well as coins, jewelry, glass, pottery and other objects from Roman Maastricht are on display in the exhibition space of the city's public library (Centre Céramique).

According to legend, the Armenian-born Saint Servatius, Bishop of Tongeren, died in Maastricht in 384 where he was interred along the Roman road, outside the castrum. According to Gregory of Tours it was bishop Monulph who around 570 built the first stone church on the grave of Servatius, a precursor of the present-day Basilica of Saint Servatius. The city remained an early Christian diocese until it lost the distinction to nearby Liège in the 8th or 9th century.

=== Middle Ages ===
In the early Middle Ages Maastricht, along with Aachen and Liège, formed part of what is considered the heartland of the Carolingian dynasty. At this time, the town was an important centre for river trade and manufacturing. Merovingian coins minted in Maastricht have been found throughout Europe. In 881 the town was plundered by the Vikings. In the 10th century it briefly became the capital of the duchy of Lower Lorraine.

During the 11th and 12th centuries the town flourished culturally. Several provosts of the chapter of Saint Servatius held important positions in the Holy Roman Empire. The two collegiate churches were largely rebuilt and redecorated during this era. Maastricht Romanesque stone sculpture and silversmithing are regarded as highlights of Mosan art. Maastricht painters were praised by Wolfram von Eschenbach in his Parzival. Around the same time, the poet Henric van Veldeke wrote a legend of Saint Servatius, one of the earliest works in Dutch literature. The two main churches acquired a wealth of relics and the septennial Maastricht Pilgrimage became a major event that drew up to 100,000 pilgrims.

Unlike most Dutch towns, Maastricht did not receive city rights at a certain date. These gradually developed during its long history. In 1204 the city's dual authority was formalised in a treaty, with the prince-bishop of Liège and the duke of Brabant holding joint sovereignty over the city. Soon afterwards the first ring of medieval walls were built. In 1275, the old Roman bridge collapsed under the weight of a procession, allegedly killing 400 people. A replacement bridge, funded by church indulgences, was built slightly to the north and survives until today, the Sint Servaasbrug.

Throughout the Middle Ages, the city remained a centre for trade and manufacturing principally of wool and leather but gradually economic decline set in. After a brief period of economic prosperity around 1500, the city's economy suffered during the wars of religion of the 16th and 17th centuries, and recovery did not happen until the Industrial Revolution in the early 19th century.

=== 16th to 18th centuries ===
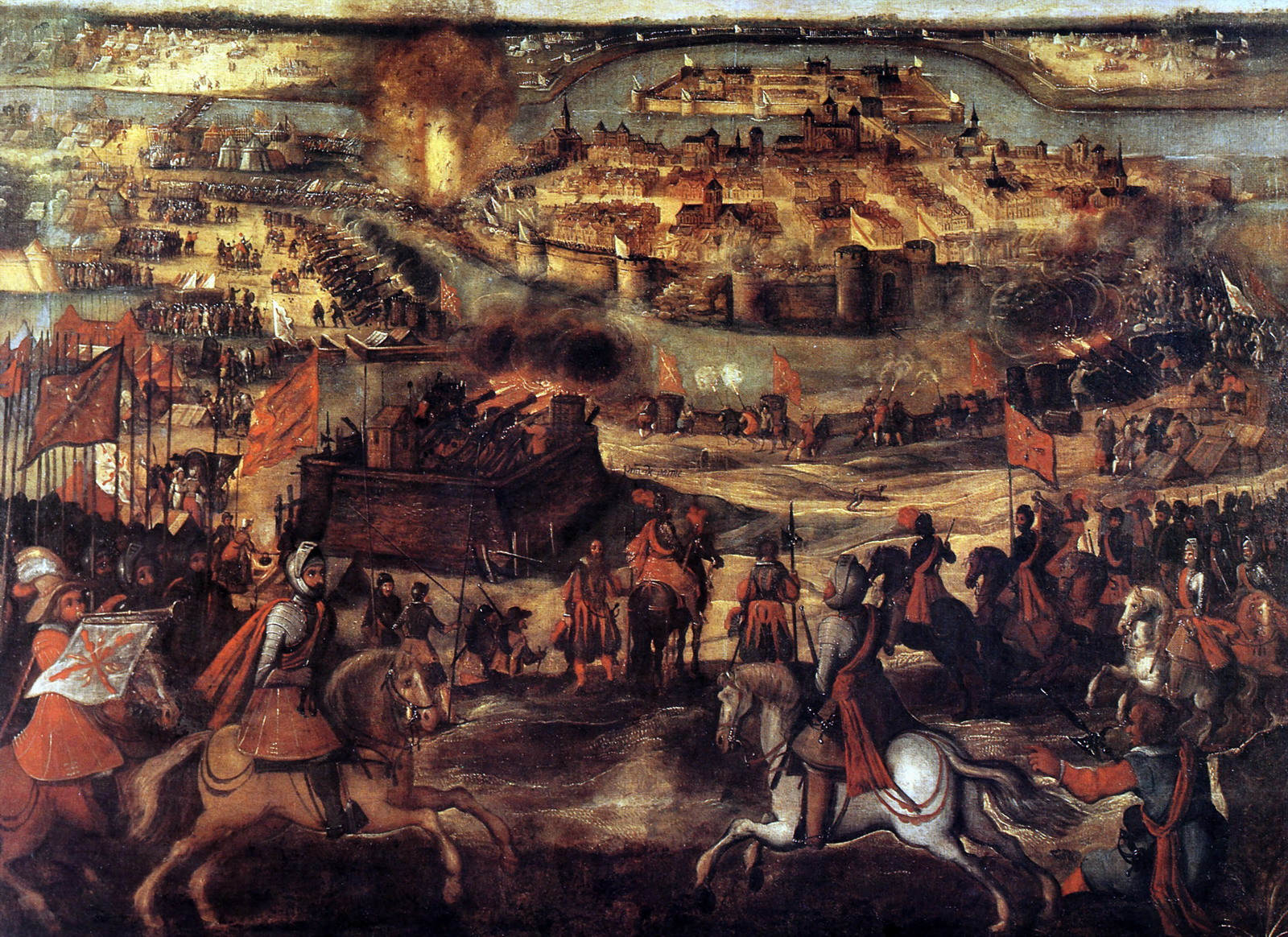
The Siege of Maastricht (1579) as depicted in the Palace of Aranjuez

The strategic location of Maastricht at a major river crossing necessitated the construction of an array of fortifications around the city during this period. The Spanish and Dutch garrisons became an important factor in the city's economy. In 1579 the city was sacked by the Spanish army led by the Duke of Parma (Siege of Maastricht, 1579). For over fifty years the Spanish crown took over the role previously held by the dukes of Brabant in the joint sovereignty over Maastricht. In 1632 the city was conquered by Prince Frederick Henry of Orange and the Dutch States General replaced the Spanish crown in the joint government of Maastricht. There was an attempt in 1634 of Spanish forces to recapture the city, but to no avail.

Another Siege of Maastricht (1673) took place during the Franco-Dutch War. In June 1673, Louis XIV laid siege to the city because French supply lines were being threatened. During this siege, Vauban, the famous French military engineer, developed a new tactic in order to break down the strong fortifications surrounding Maastricht. His systematic approach remained the standard method of attacking fortresses until the 20th century. On 25 June 1673, while preparing to storm the city, captain-lieutenant Charles de Batz de Castelmore, also known as the comte d'Artagnan, was killed by a musket shot outside the Tongerse Poort. This event was embellished in the Alexandre Dumas novel The Vicomte de Bragelonne, part of the D'Artagnan Romances. French troops occupied Maastricht from 1673 to 1678.

In 1748 the French again conquered the city at what is known as the Second French Siege of Maastricht, during the War of Austrian Succession. After each siege the city's fortifications were restored and expanded. The French revolutionary army failed to take the city in 1793 but a year later they succeeded. The condominium was dissolved and Maastricht was annexed to the French First Republic, later the First French Empire. For almost twenty years (1795–1814/15) Maastricht was the capital of the French département of Meuse-Inférieure.

=== 19th and early 20th century ===
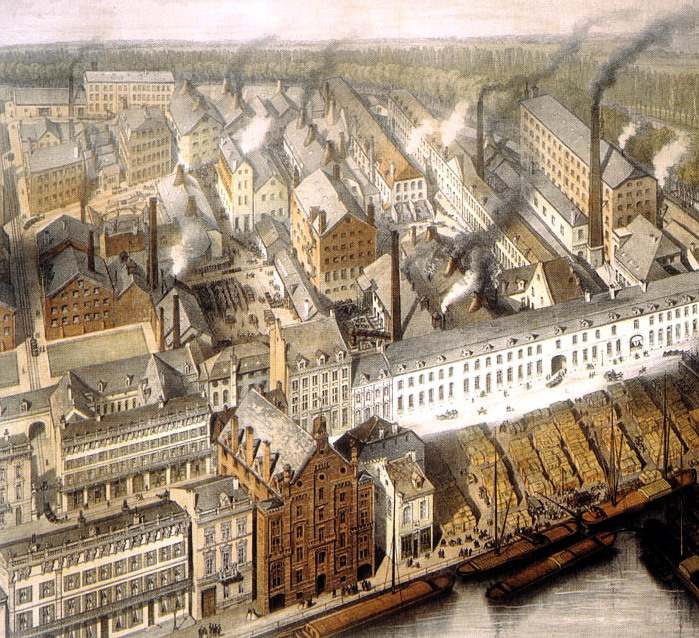
19th-century industry: Maastricht potteries in Boschstraat

After the Napoleonic era, Maastricht became part of the United Kingdom of the Netherlands in 1815. It was made the capital of the newly formed Province of Limburg (1815–1839). When the southern provinces of the newly formed kingdom seceded in 1830, the Dutch garrison in Maastricht remained loyal to the Dutch king, William I, even when most of the inhabitants of the town and the surrounding area sided with the Belgian revolutionaries. In 1831, arbitration by the Great Powers allocated the city to the Netherlands. However, neither the Dutch nor the Belgians agreed to this and the arrangement was not implemented until the 1839 Treaty of London. During this period of isolation Maastricht developed into an early industrial town.

Plate commemorating the liberation, 14 September 1944

Because of its eccentric location in the southeastern Netherlands, as well as its geographical and cultural proximity to Belgium and Germany, integration of Maastricht and Limburg into the Netherlands did not come about easily. Maastricht retained a distinctly non-Dutch appearance during much of the 19th century and it was not until the First World War that the city was forced to look northwards.

Like the rest of the Netherlands, Maastricht remained neutral during World War I. However, being wedged between Germany and Belgium, it received large numbers of refugees, putting a strain on the city's resources. Early in World War II, the city was taken by the Germans by surprise during the Battle of Maastricht of May 1940. On 13 and 14 September 1944 it was the first Dutch city to be liberated by Allied forces of the US Old Hickory Division. The three Meuse bridges were destroyed or severely damaged during the war. As elsewhere in the Netherlands, the majority of Maastricht Jews died in Nazi concentration camps.

=== After World War II ===
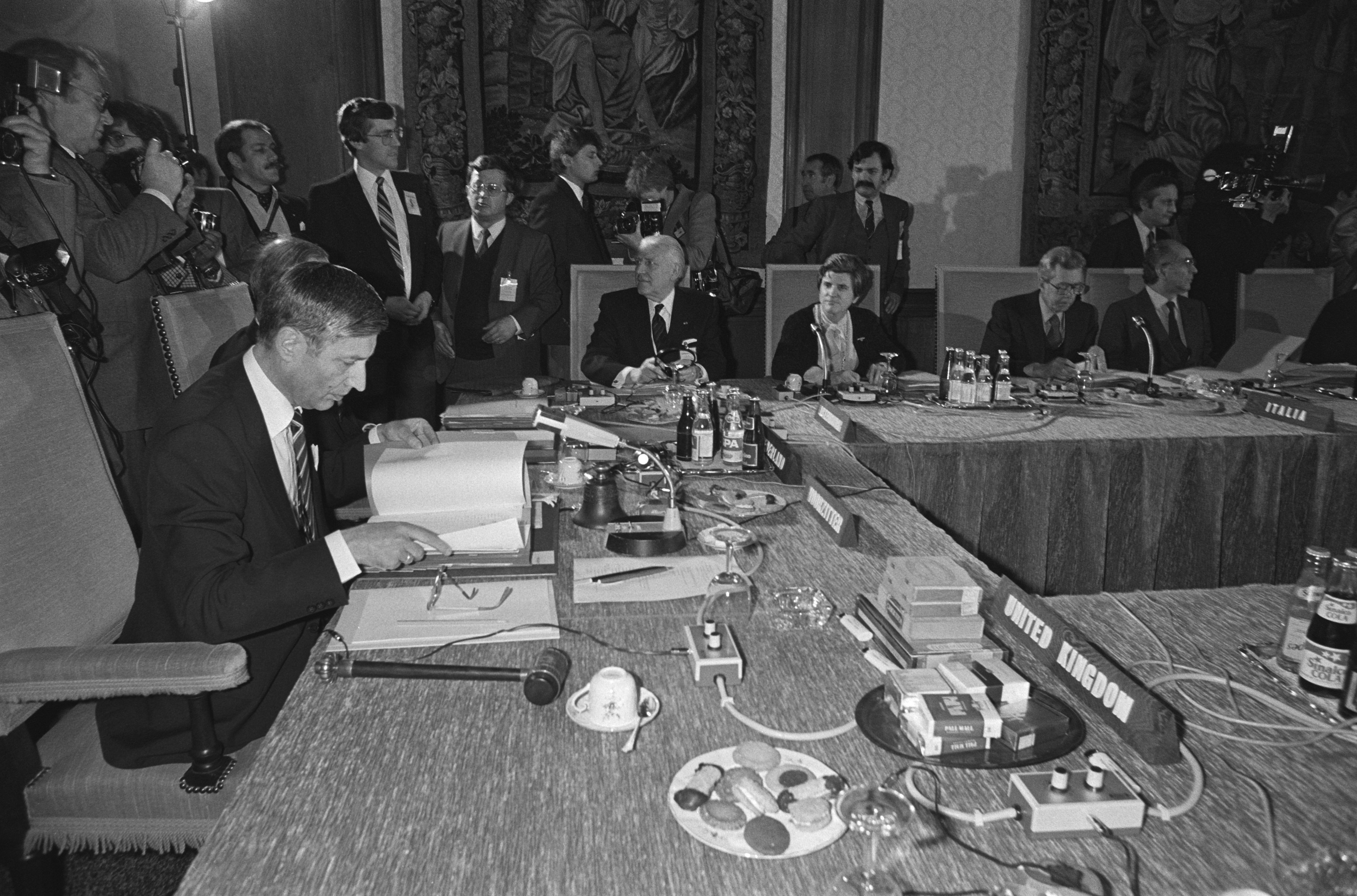
Prime minister Dries van Agt presiding over the 1981 European Council in the town hall

During the latter half of the century, traditional industries (such as Maastricht's potteries) declined and the city's economy shifted to a service economy. Maastricht University was founded in 1976. Several European institutions found their base in Maastricht. In 1981 and 1991 European Councils were held in Maastricht, the latter one resulting a year later in the signing of the Maastricht Treaty, leading to the creation of the European Union and the euro. Since 1988, The European Fine Art Fair, regarded as the world's leading art fair, annually draws in some of the wealthiest art collectors.

Since the 1990s, large parts of the city have been refurbished, including the areas around the main railway station and the Maasboulevard promenade along the Meuse, the Entre Deux and Mosae Forum shopping centres, as well as some of the main shopping streets. A prestigious quarter designed by international architects and including the new Bonnefanten Museum, a public library, and a theatre was built on the grounds of the former Société Céramique factory near the town centre. Further large-scale projects, such as the redevelopment of the area around the A2 motorway, the Sphinx Quarter and the Belvédère area are under construction.

In the early 2000s, Maastricht launched several campaigns against drug-dealing in an attempt to stop foreign buyers taking advantage of the liberal Dutch legislation and causing trouble in the downtown area.

== Geography ==
=== Neighbourhoods ===
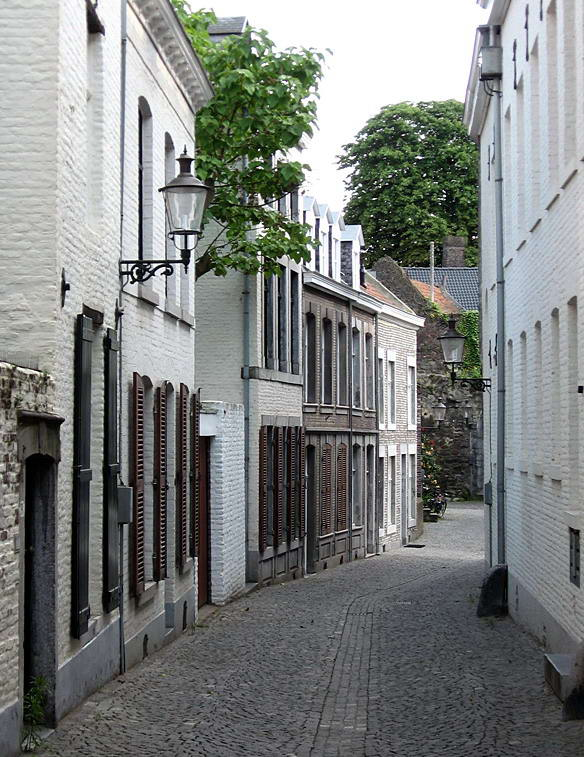
Typical street in the Jekerkwartier, part of the city centre

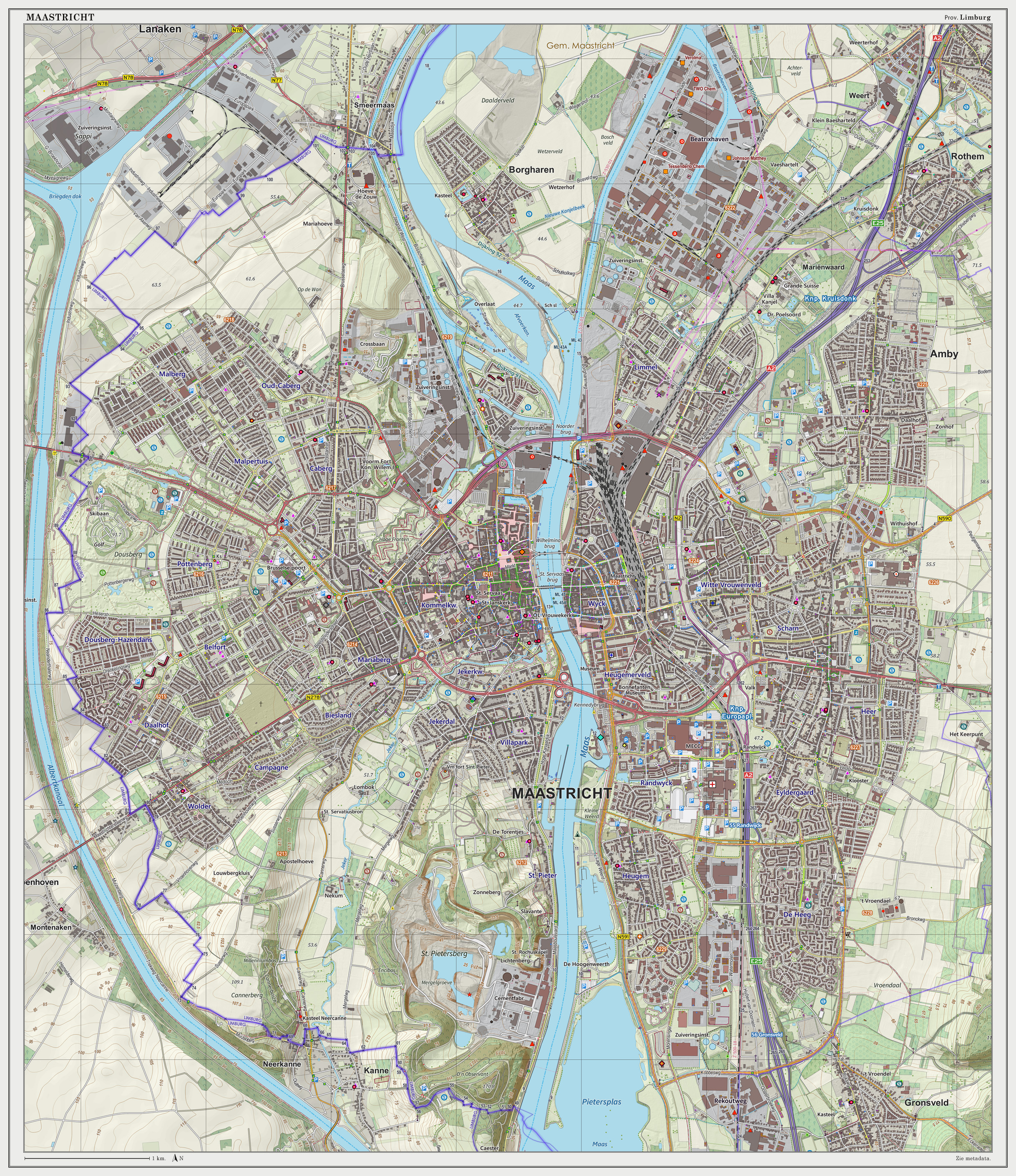
Dutch topographic map of Maastricht, March 2014

Maastricht consists of seven areas (wijken) and 44 neighbourhoods (buurten). Each area and neighbourhood has a number which corresponds to its CBS code.

1. Maastricht Centrum (CBS area code: 093500): Binnenstad, Jekerkwartier, Kommelkwartier, Statenkwartier, Boschstraatkwartier, Sint Maartenspoort, Wyck-Céramique
2. South-West (093501): Villapark, Jekerdal, Biesland, Campagne, Wolder, Sint Pieter)
3. West (093502): Brusselsepoort, Mariaberg, Belfort, Pottenberg, Malpertuis, Caberg, Malberg, Dousberg-Hazendans, Daalhof
4. North-West (093503): Boschpoort, Bosscherveld, Frontenkwartier, Belvédère, Lanakerveld
5. North-East (093505): Beatrixhaven, Borgharen, Itteren, Meerssenhoven
6. East (093504): Wyckerpoort, Wittevrouwenveld, Nazareth, Limmel, Amby, Scharn, Heugemerveld
7. South-East (093506): Randwyck, Heugem, Heer, De Heeg, Vroendaal

Itteren, Borgharen, Limmel, Amby, Heer, Heugem, Scharn, Oud-Caberg, Sint Pieter and Wolder are neighbourhoods that used to be separate municipalities or villages until they were annexed by the city of Maastricht in the course of the 20th century.

=== Neighbouring municipalities ===
The outlying areas of the following municipalities are bordering the municipality of Maastricht directly.

Clockwise from north-east to north-west:

- Bunde,
- Meerssen,
- Berg en Terblijt,
- Bemelen,
- Cadier en Keer,
- Gronsveld,
- Oost,
- Lanaye (B),
- Petit-Lanaye (B),
- Kanne (B),
- Vroenhoven (B),
- Kesselt (B),
- Veldwezelt (B),
- Lanaken (B),
- Neerharen (B).

(B = Situated in Belgium)

=== Border ===
Maastricht's city limits have an international border with Belgium. Most of it borders Belgium's Flemish region, but a small part to the south also has a border with Wallonia. Both countries are part of Europe's Schengen Area and, thus, are open without border controls.

=== Climate ===
Maastricht features the same climate as most of the Netherlands (Cfb, Oceanic climate), however, due to its more inland location in between hills, summers tend to be warmer (especially in the Meuse valley, which lies 70 m [230 ft] lower than the meteorological station) and winters a bit colder. The highest temperature recorded was on 25 July 2019 at 39.6 °C (103.3 °F).

Climate data for Maastricht (1991−2020 normals, extremes 1906−present)
Month	Jan	Feb	Mar	Apr	May	Jun	Jul	Aug	Sep	Oct	Nov	Dec	Year
Record high °C (°F)	16.5 (61.7)	19.8 (67.6)	24.2 (75.6)	29.7 (85.5)	33.1 (91.6)	37.3 (99.1)	39.6 (103.3)	36.8 (98.2)	34.3 (93.7)	28.7 (83.7)	21.4 (70.5)	17.0 (62.6)	39.6 (103.3)
Mean maximum °C (°F)	12.5 (54.5)	13.6 (56.5)	18.3 (64.9)	23.2 (73.8)	27.3 (81.1)	30.9 (87.6)	32.5 (90.5)	31.8 (89.2)	26.8 (80.2)	22.1 (71.8)	16.3 (61.3)	12.8 (55.0)	34.3 (93.7)
Mean daily maximum °C (°F)	5.7 (42.3)	6.7 (44.1)	10.7 (51.3)	15.0 (59.0)	18.8 (65.8)	21.7 (71.1)	23.8 (74.8)	23.5 (74.3)	19.7 (67.5)	14.8 (58.6)	9.7 (49.5)	6.3 (43.3)	14.7 (58.5)
Daily mean °C (°F)	3.2 (37.8)	3.7 (38.7)	6.6 (43.9)	10.1 (50.2)	13.8 (56.8)	16.8 (62.2)	18.8 (65.8)	18.4 (65.1)	15.0 (59.0)	11.0 (51.8)	6.8 (44.2)	4.0 (39.2)	10.7 (51.3)
Mean daily minimum °C (°F)	0.5 (32.9)	0.7 (33.3)	2.7 (36.9)	5.0 (41.0)	8.7 (47.7)	11.7 (53.1)	13.8 (56.8)	13.4 (56.1)	10.6 (51.1)	7.3 (45.1)	3.8 (38.8)	1.4 (34.5)	6.6 (43.9)
Mean minimum °C (°F)	−7.3 (18.9)	−6.0 (21.2)	−3.5 (25.7)	−1.0 (30.2)	2.5 (36.5)	6.4 (43.5)	9.0 (48.2)	8.8 (47.8)	5.6 (42.1)	0.8 (33.4)	−2.6 (27.3)	−5.5 (22.1)	−9.5 (14.9)
Record low °C (°F)	−19.3 (−2.7)	−21.4 (−6.5)	−12.9 (8.8)	−5.6 (21.9)	−1.6 (29.1)	0.7 (33.3)	4.3 (39.7)	4.9 (40.8)	−0.9 (30.4)	−6.5 (20.3)	−12.0 (10.4)	−18.3 (−0.9)	−21.4 (−6.5)
Average precipitation mm (inches)	63.8 (2.51)	57.6 (2.27)	54.6 (2.15)	41.0 (1.61)	57.7 (2.27)	68.9 (2.71)	72.8 (2.87)	82.8 (3.26)	57.5 (2.26)	63.6 (2.50)	62.2 (2.45)	74.3 (2.93)	756.8 (29.80)
Average precipitation days (≥ 1 mm)	12.0	10.8	10.4	8.4	9.4	9.7	10.2	10.2	8.8	10.7	11.7	13.2	125.7
Average snowy days	6.1	6.7	3.3	0.3	0.1	0.0	0.0	0.0	0.0	0.1	1.1	4.7	22.2
Average relative humidity (%)	86.4	83.2	77.7	71.7	72.1	72.8	73.1	74.8	79.4	83.9	87.9	88.3	79.3
Mean monthly sunshine hours	66.9	86.0	138.5	180.8	208.7	205.5	209.0	197.5	157.0	118.2	74.1	53.5	1,695.7
Percentage possible sunshine	25.4	30.3	37.5	43.7	43.4	41.7	42.1	43.8	41.3	35.5	27.4	21.5	36.1
Source: Royal Netherlands Meteorological Institute (snowy days 2003–2020) Infoclimat

== Demographics ==
Historical population
Year	Pop.	±% p.a.
1400	7,000	—
1500	10,000	+0.36%
1560	13,500	+0.50%
1600	12,600	−0.17%
1650	18,000	+0.72%
1740	12,500	−0.40%
1796	17,963	+0.65%
1818	20,000	+0.49%
1950	77,710	+1.03%
1960	90,202	+1.50%
1970	93,927	+0.41%
1980	109,285	+1.53%
1990	117,008	+0.69%
2000	122,070	+0.42%
2010	118,533	−0.29%
2020	121,575	+0.25%
Source: Lourens & Lucassen 1997, pp. 32–33 (1400–1795); Statistics Netherlands

=== Inhabitants by nationality ===
Maastricht residents by nationality – Top 10 (2000–2021)
Nationality	2021	2014	2010	2000
Netherlands	100,297	107,418	109,722	116,171
Germany	3,908	3,869	1,956	783
Italy	1,572	653	387	280
Belgium	1,475	1,055	946	909
Spain	913	431	232	241
United Kingdom	842	815	386	280
China	739	595	248	87
France	686	351	214	120
United States	665	623	277	162
Turkey	436	404	368	404

=== Inhabitants by country of birth ===
Maastricht residents by country of birth – Top 10 (2000–2020)
Country of birth	2020	2013	2010	2000
Netherlands	93,162	100,269	102,433	109,632
Germany	3,949	4,100	2,467	1,444
Belgium	2,355	1,920	1,839	1,900
United States	1,380	753	383	217
Indonesia	1,020	1,199	1,267	1,556
China (excl. Hong Kong and Macau)	1,019	651	373	215
Turkey	973	919	836	784
United Kingdom	926	677	404	310
Morocco	829	838	867	859
Poland	563	437	316	152

=== Languages ===
Maastricht is a city of linguistic diversity, partly as a result of its location at the crossroads of multiple language areas and its international student population.

- Dutch is the national language and the language of elementary and secondary education (excluding international institutions) as well as administration. Dutch in Maastricht is often spoken with a distinctive Limburgish accent, which should not be confused with the Limburgish language.
- Limburgish (or Limburgian) is the overlapping term of the tonal dialects spoken in the Dutch and the Belgian provinces of Limburg. The Maastrichtian dialect (Mestreechs) is only one of many variants of Limburgish. It is characterised by stretched vowels and some French influence on its vocabulary. In recent years the Maastricht dialect has been in decline (see dialect levelling) and a language switch to Standard Dutch has been noted.
- French used to be the language of education and culture in Maastricht. In the late 18th century the language gained a powerful position as the judicial and administrative language, and throughout the following century it was the preferred language of the upper classes. Between 1851 and 1892 a Francophone newspaper (Le Courrier de la Meuse) was published in Maastricht. The language is often part of secondary school curricula. Many proper names are French and the language has left many traces in the local dialect.
- German, like French, is often part of secondary school curricula. Due to Maastricht's geographic proximity to Germany and the great number of German students in the city, German is widely spoken.
- English has become an important language in education. At Maastricht University and Hogeschool Zuyd it is the language of instruction for many courses. Many foreign students and expatriates use English as a lingua franca. English is also a mandatory subject in Dutch secondary schools.

=== Religion ===
Religions in Maastricht (2013)
1. Roman Catholic (60.1%)
2. Protestant Church in the Netherlands (2.80%)
3. Other Christian denominations (2.20%)
4. Islam (3.30%)
5. Hinduism (0.10%)
6. Buddhism (0.40%)
7. Judaism (0.20%)
8. No affiliation (30.9%)

In 2010–2014, 69.8% of the population of Maastricht regarded themselves as religious. 60.4% of the total population stated an affiliation with the Roman Catholic Church. 13.9% attended a religious ceremony at least once a month.

== Economy ==
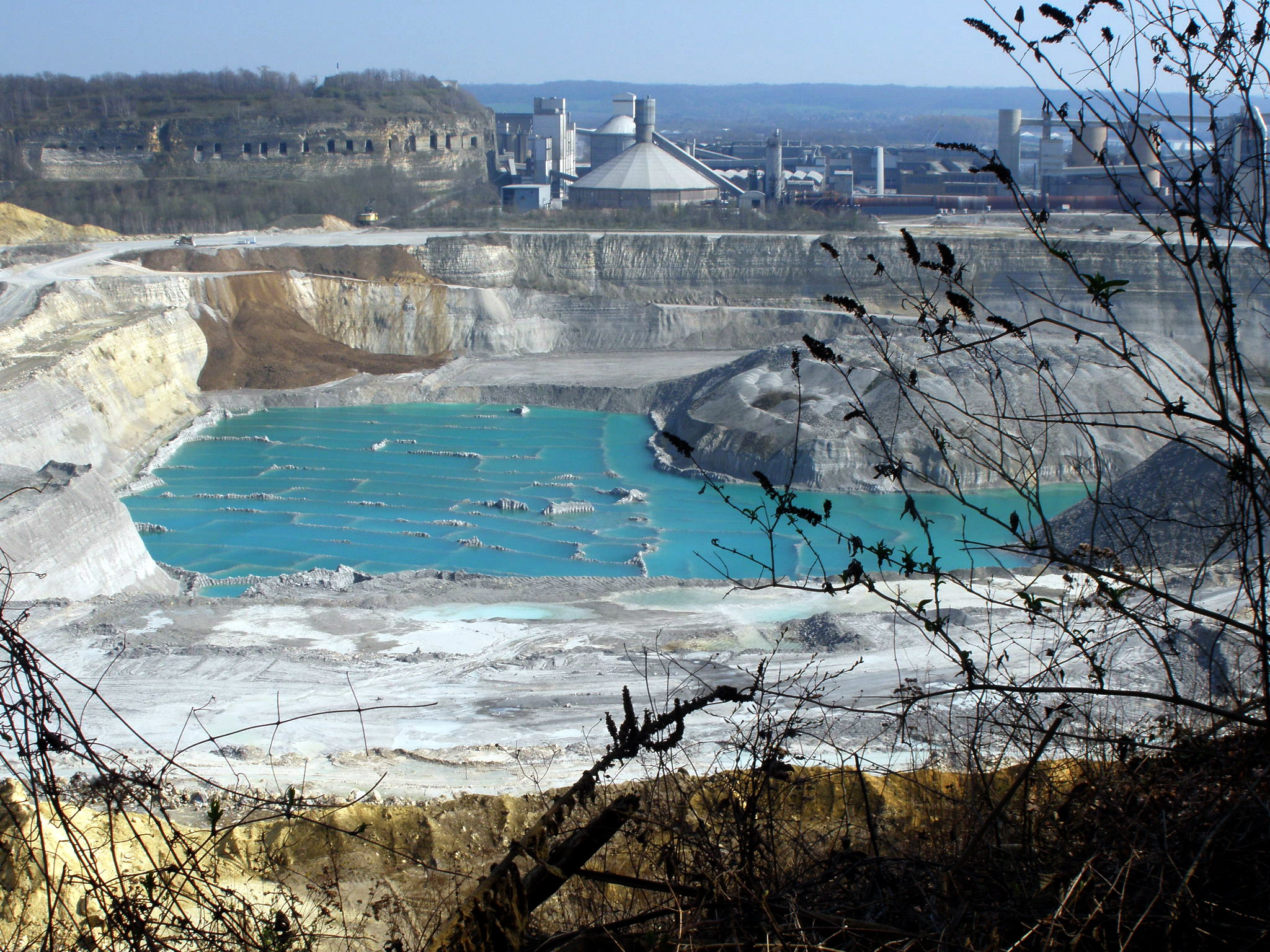
ENCI quarry

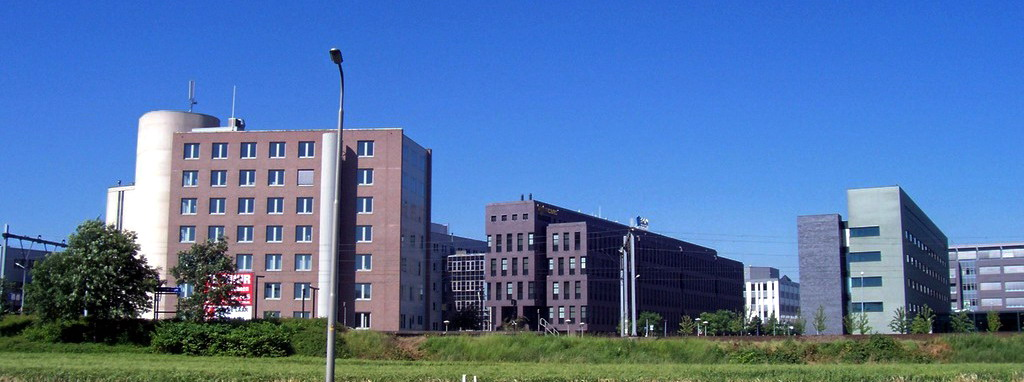
Office park Randwyck-Noord

=== Private companies based in Maastricht ===
- Sappi – South African Pulp and Paper Industry
- Royal Mosa – ceramic tiles
- O-I Manufacturing, previously Kristalunie Maastricht – glass. Closed in October 2025
- BASF – previously Ten Horn; pigments
- Mondi – packaging
- Rubber Resources/Elgi Rubber – previously Vredestein; rubber recycling
- Radium Foams – Talalay products
- Hewlett-Packard –e previously Indigo, manufacturer of electronic data systems
- Vodafone – mobile phone company
- Q-Park – international operator of parking garages
- DHL – international express mail services
- Teleperformance – contact center services
- Mercedes-Benz – customer contact centre for Europe
- VGZ – health insurance, customer contact centre
- Pie Medical Imaging – cardiovascular quantitative analysis software
- Esaote (formerly Pie Medical Equipment) – manufacturer of medical and veterinary diagnostic equipment
- BioPartner Centre Maastricht – life sciences spin-off companies
- Medtronic – medical devices, R&D center
- DSM-Firmenich - Swiss-Dutch multinational chemical company

=== Public institutions ===
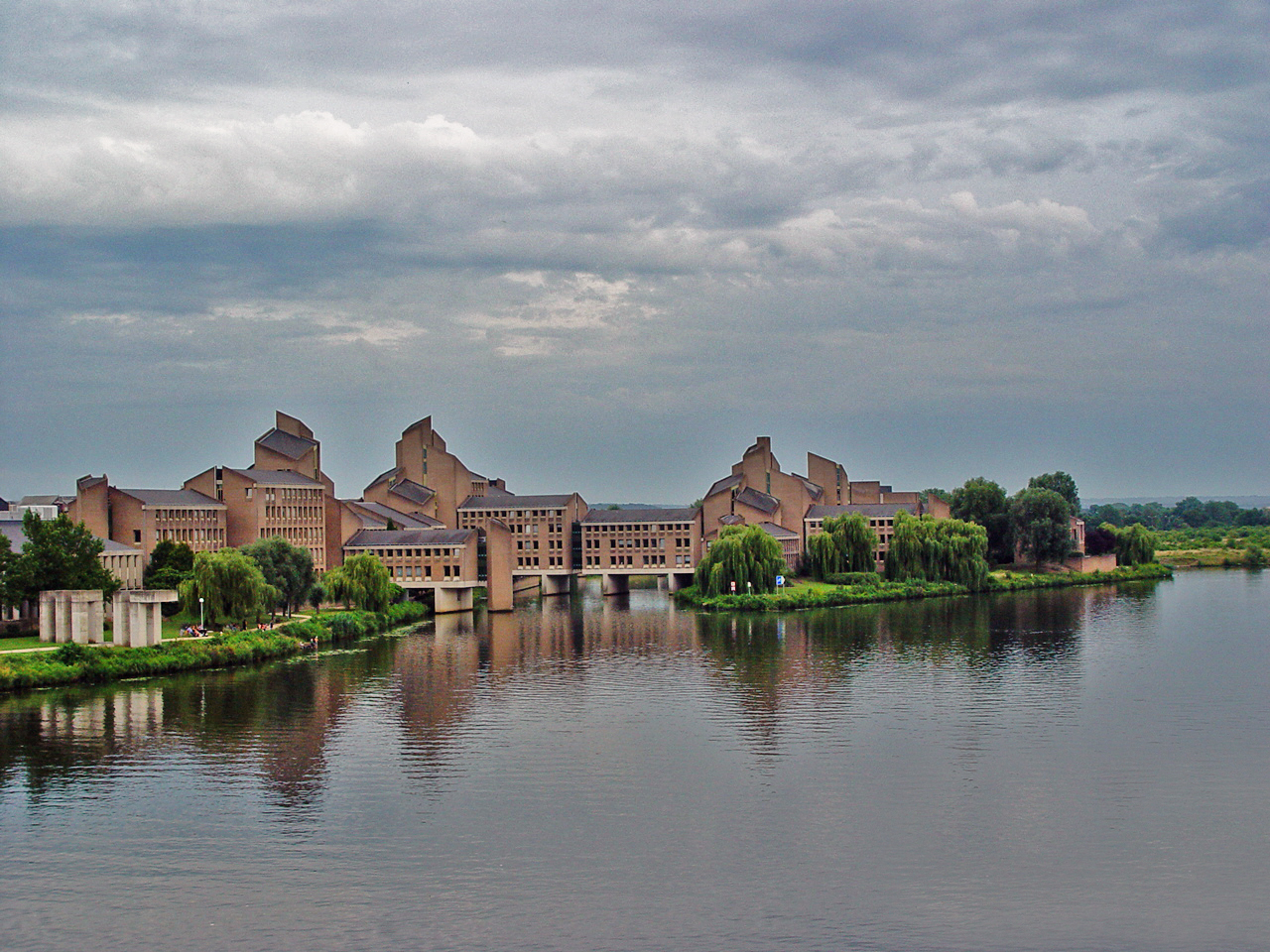
Provincial Government Buildings

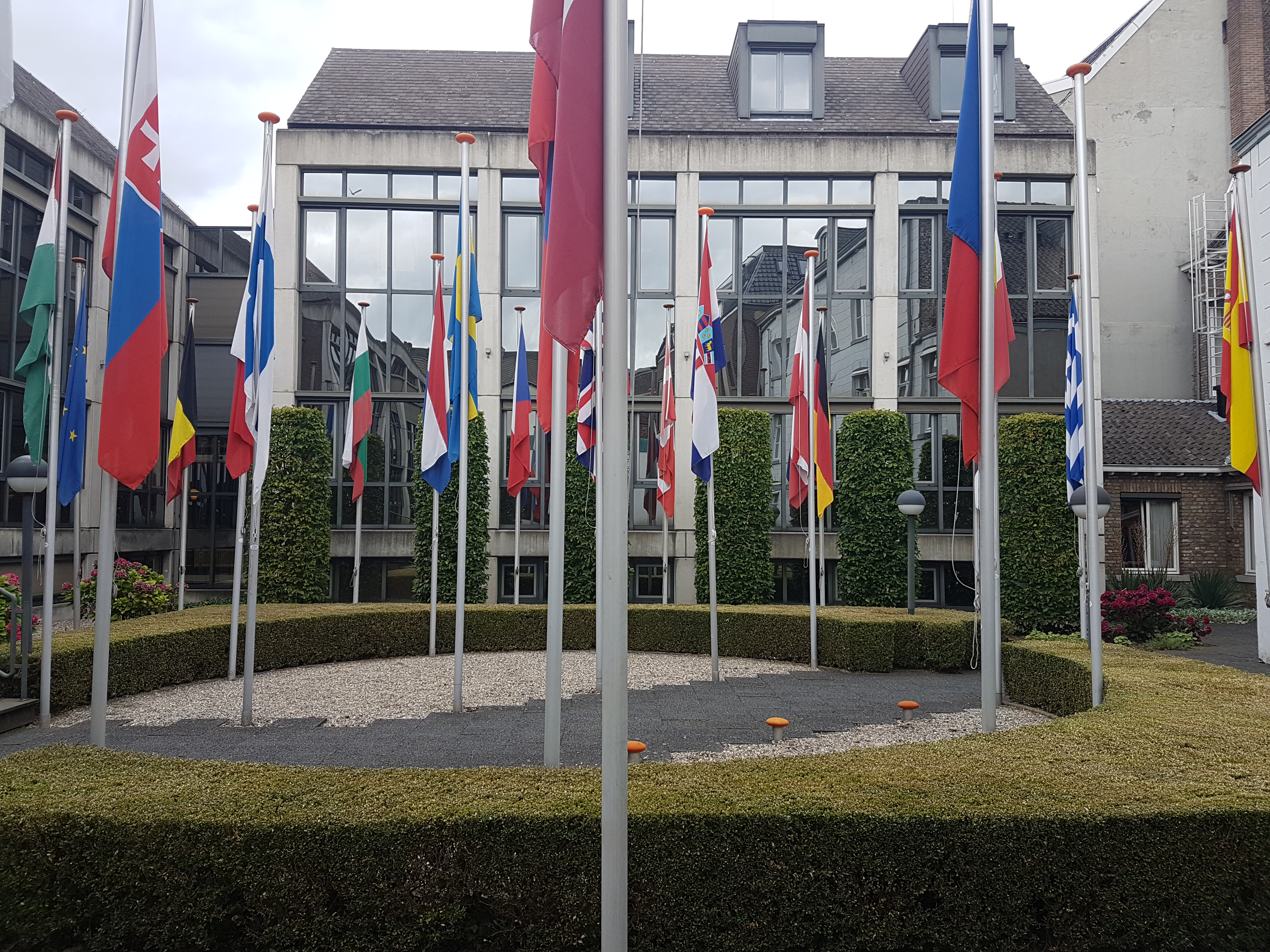
European Institute of Public Administration

Since the 1980s, a number of European and international institutions have made Maastricht their base. They provide an increasing number of employment opportunities for expats living in the Maastricht area.

- Administration of the Dutch province of Limburg
- Meuse-Rhine Euroregion
- Limburg Development Company LIOF
- RHCL and SHCL – archives of the province of Limburg
- Eurocontrol – The European Organisation for the Safety of Air Navigation
- European Journalism Centre
- European Institute of Public Administration (EIPA)
- European Centre for Development Policy Management (ECDPM)
- European centre for work and society (ECWS)
- Maastricht Centre for Transatlantic Studies (MCTS)
- Expert Centre for Sustainable Business and Development Cooperation (ECSAD)
- Council of European Municipalities and Regions (REGR)
- European Centre for Digital Communication (EC/DC)
- UNU-MERIT
- Maastricht Research School of Economics of TEchnology and ORganization (METEOR)
- Research Institute for Knowledge Systems (RIKS)
- Cicero Foundation (CF)

== Culture and tourism ==
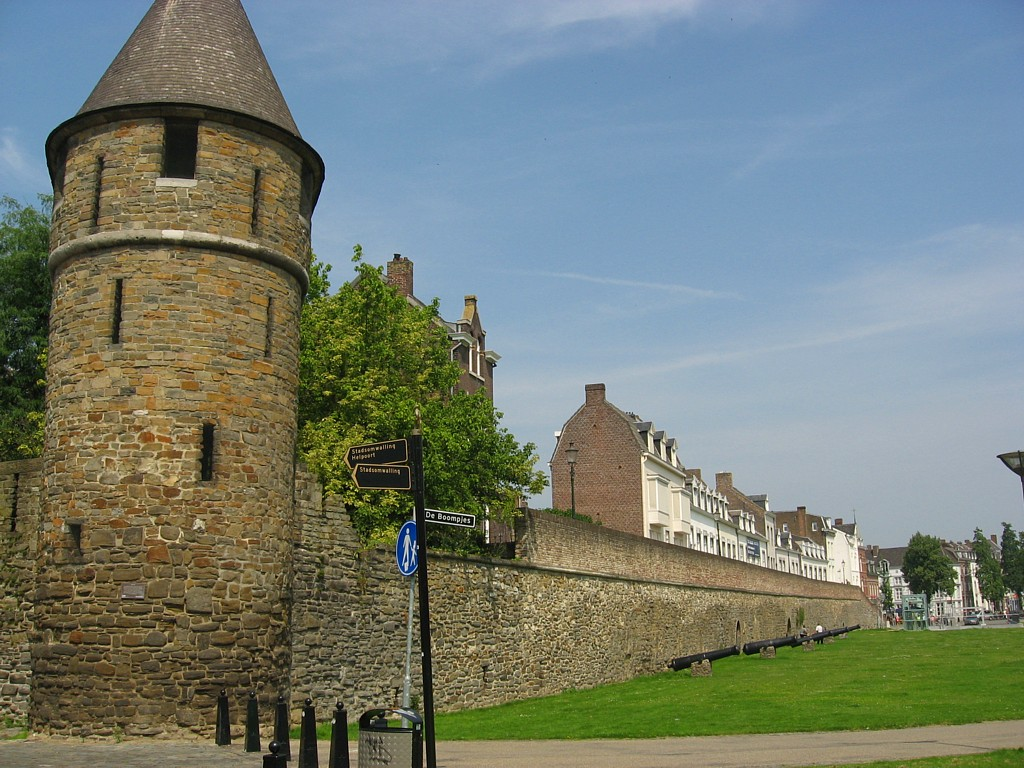
Medieval city wall (Onze-Lieve-Vrouwewal)

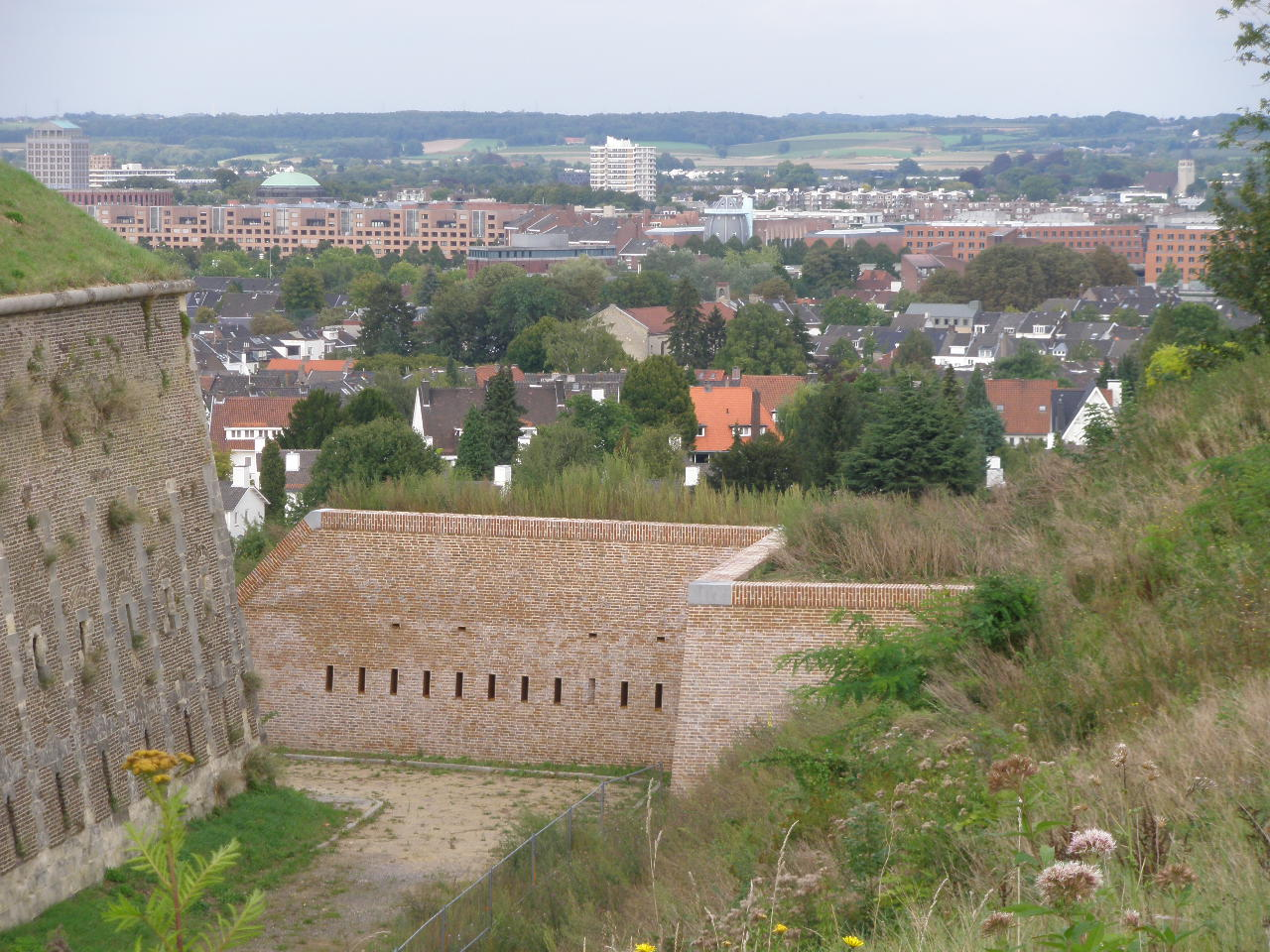
View of Maastricht from the fortress on Mount Saint Peter

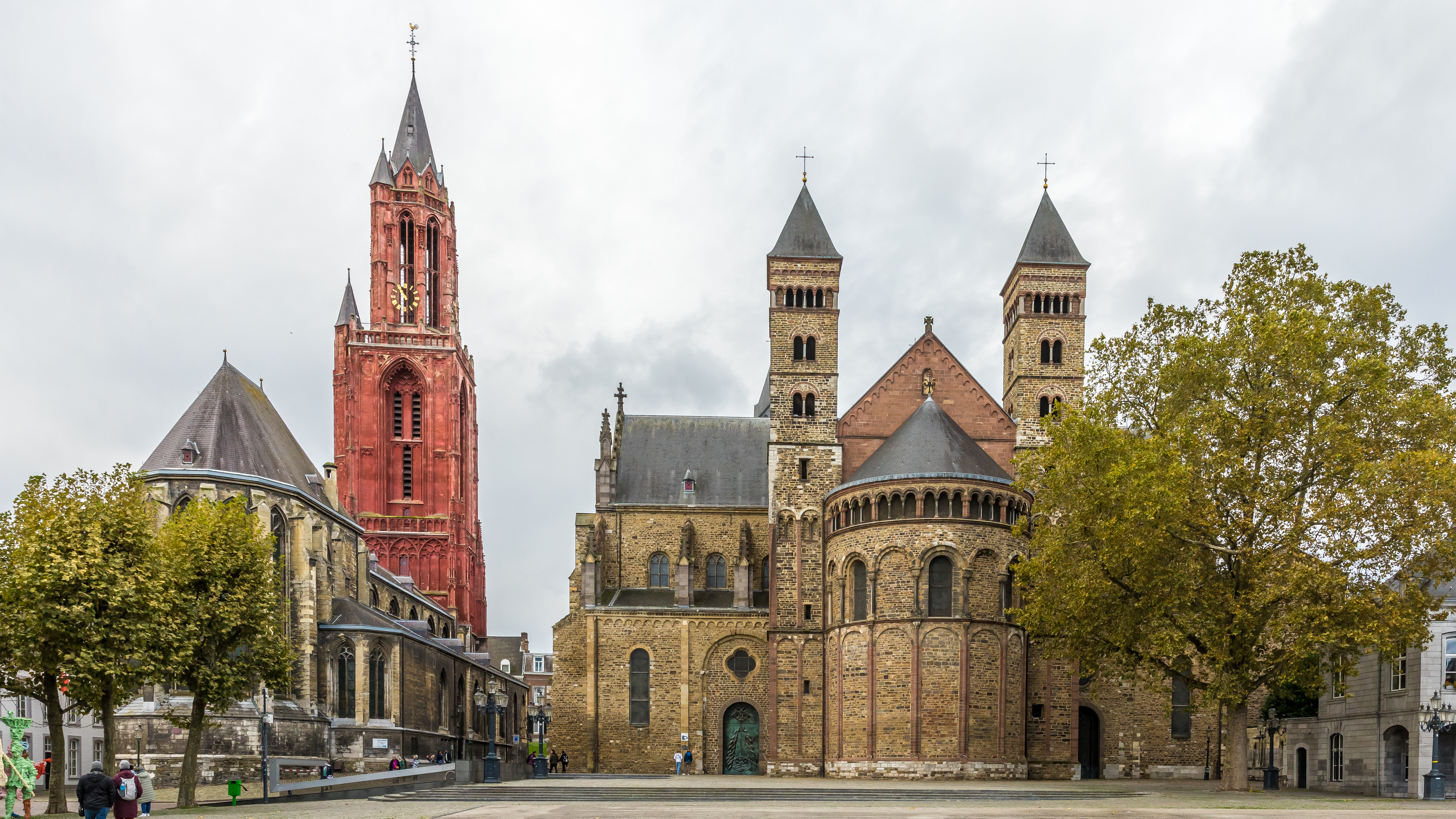
Vrijthof with Saint John's (left) and Saint Servatius Basilica

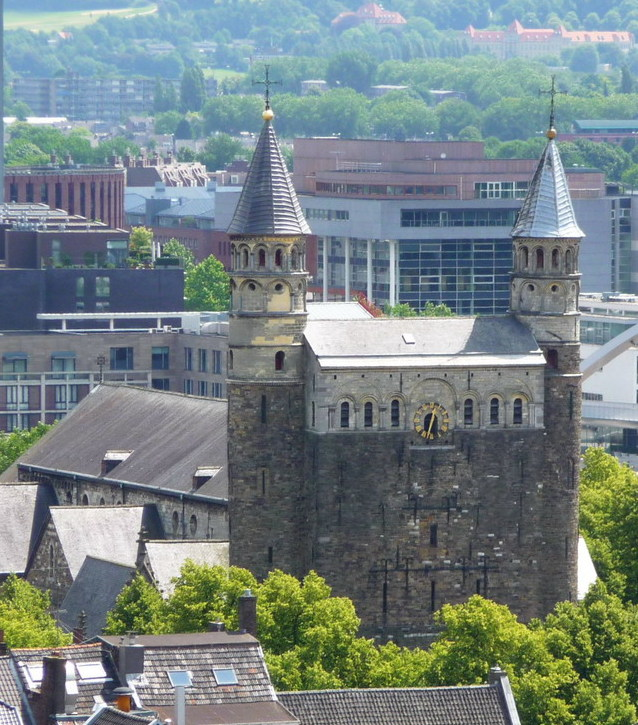
View of Our Lady's from the church tower of Saint John's

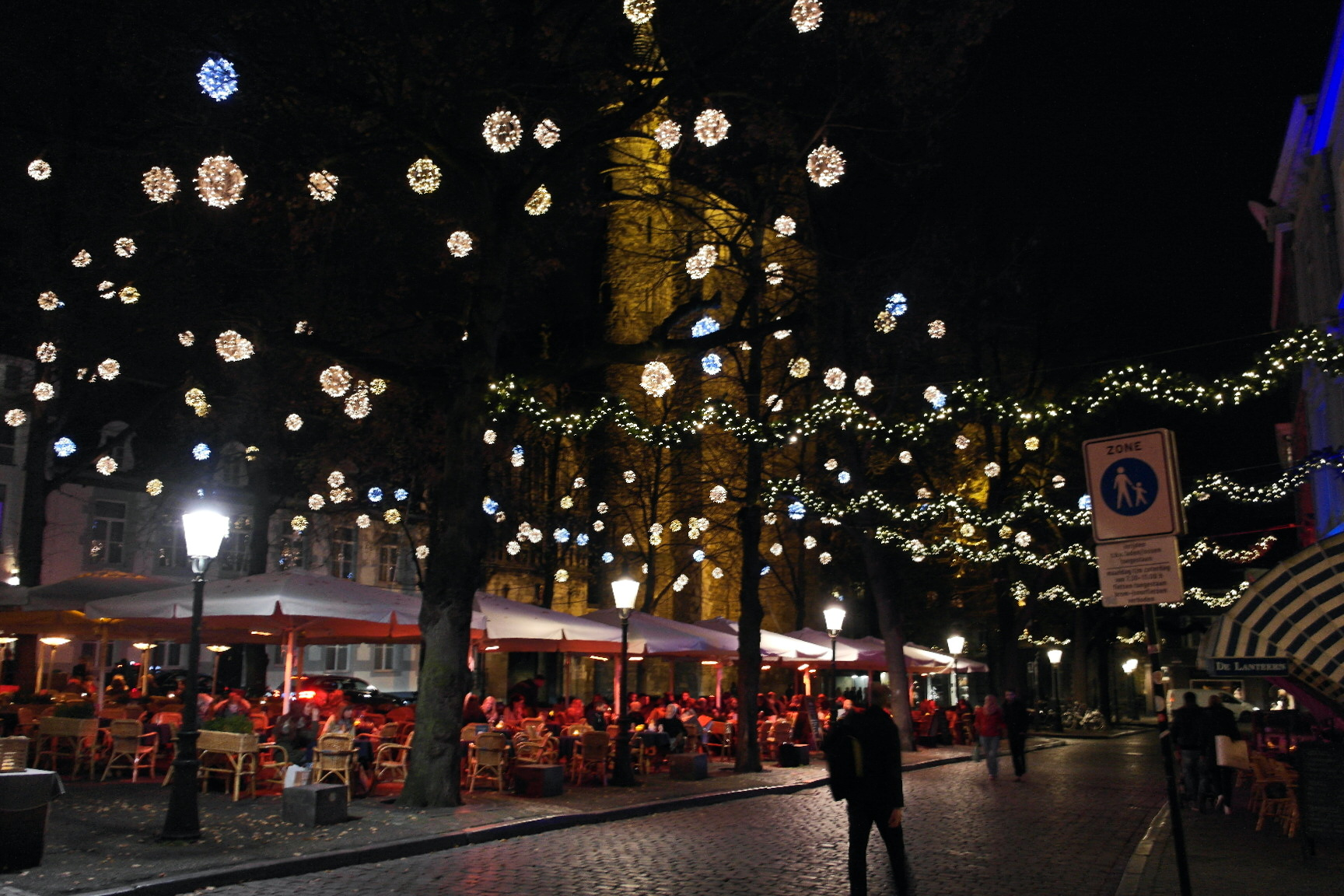
Christmas decorations at Onze Lieve Vrouweplein

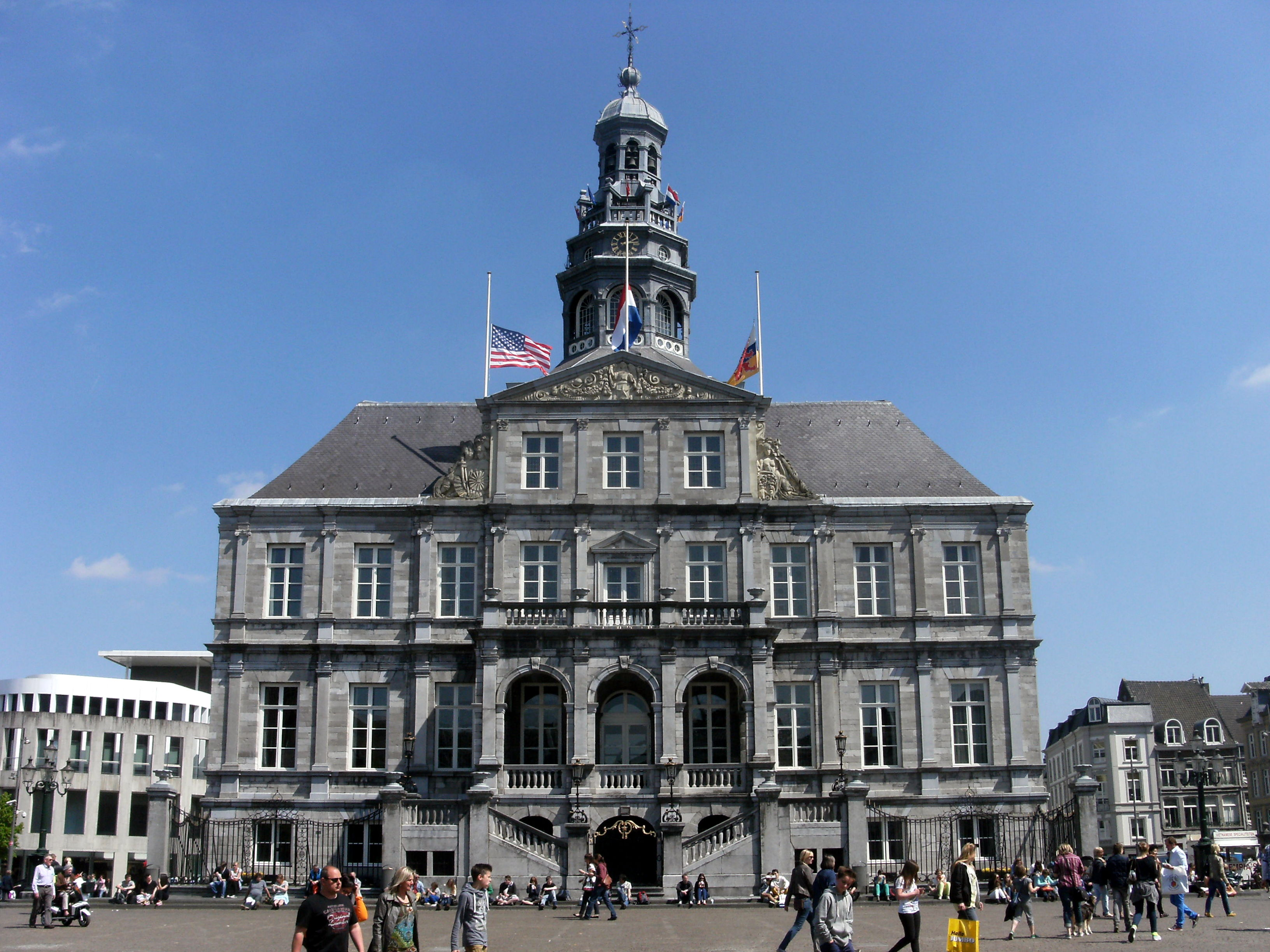
Markt and town hall

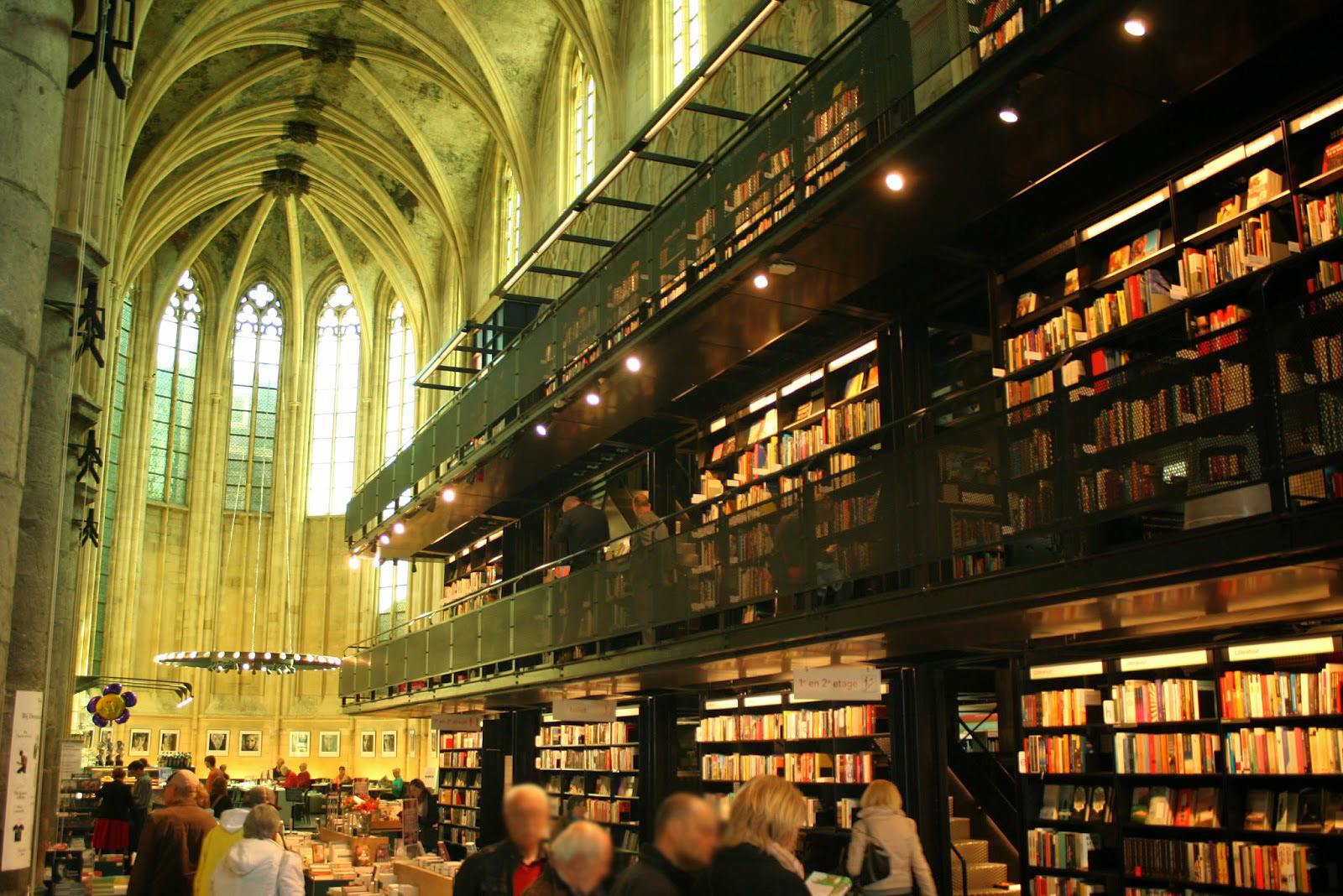
13th-century Dominican church converted into a bookstore

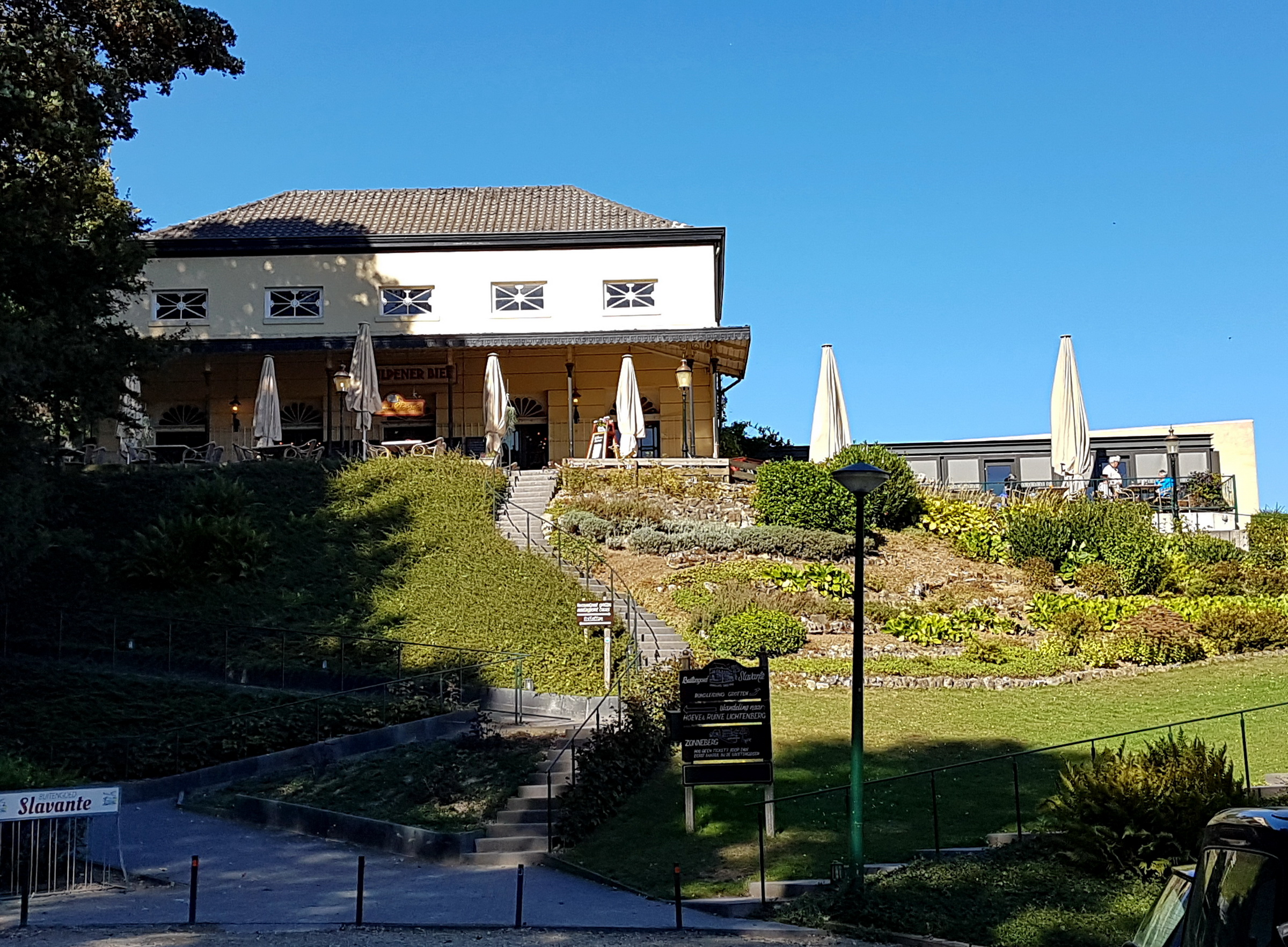
Slavante on the slopes of Mount Saint Peter

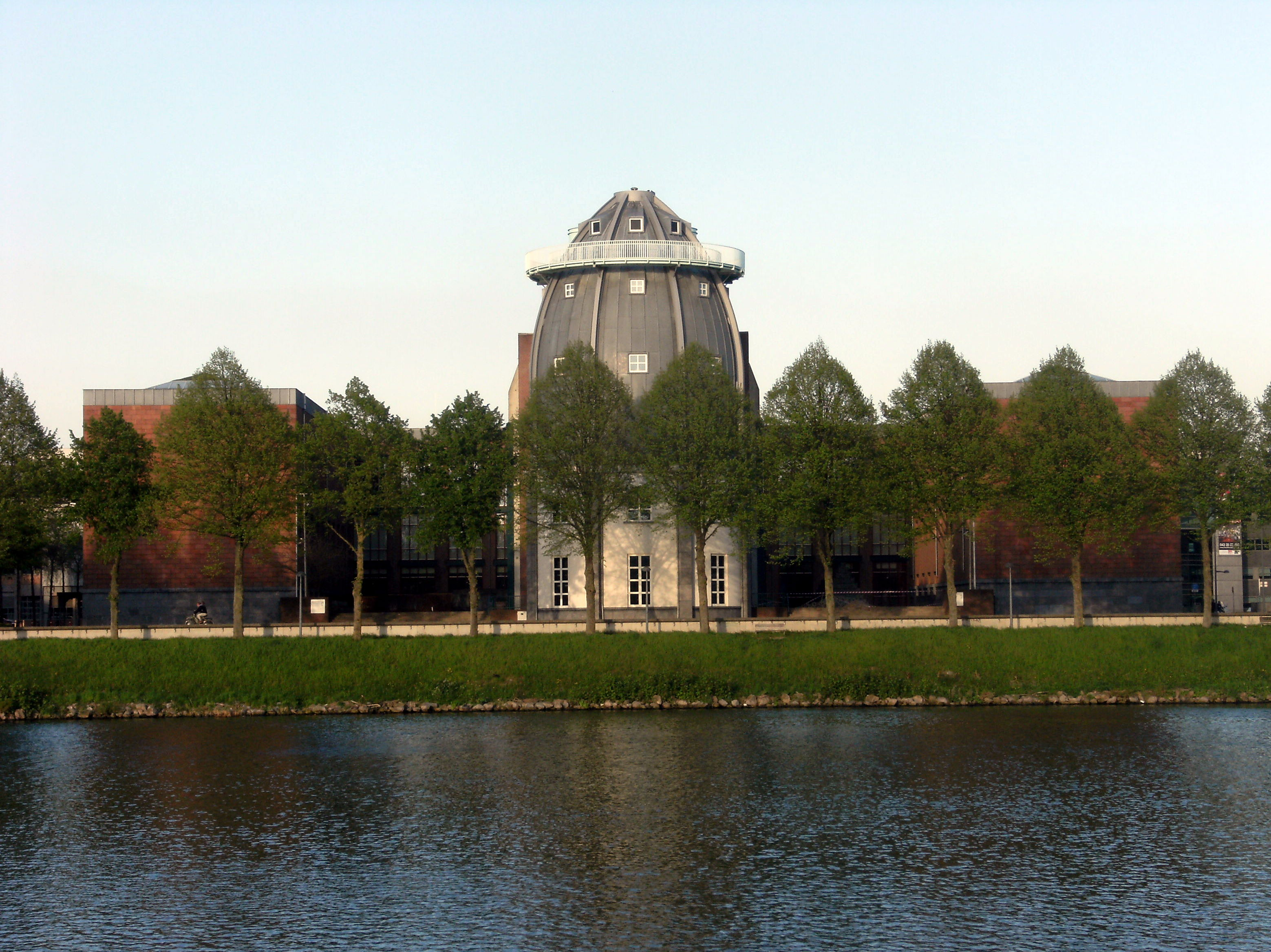
The landmark tower of the Bonnefanten Museum on the east bank of the Meuse in Wyck-Céramique

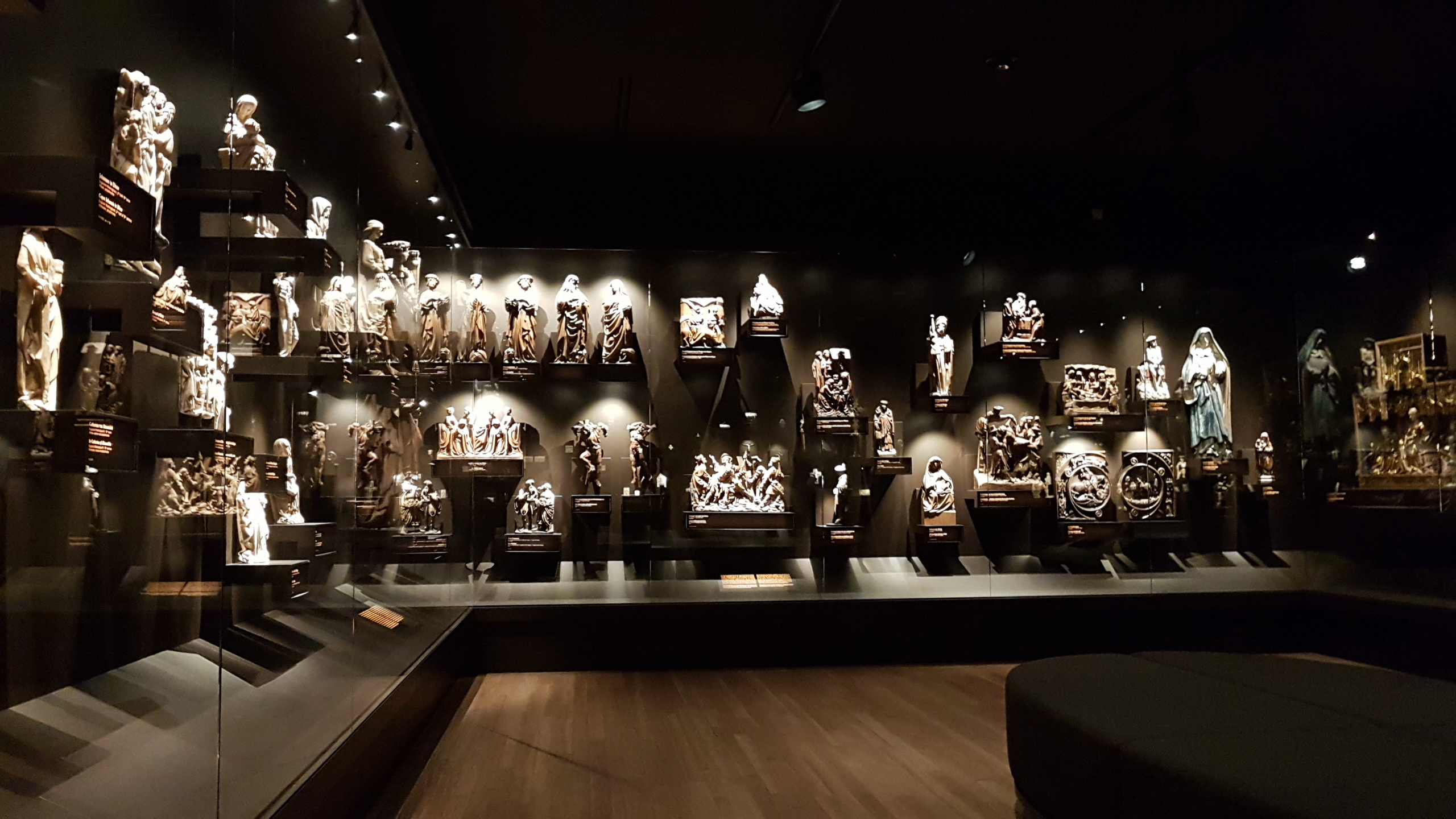
Medieval art in the Bonnefantenmuseum

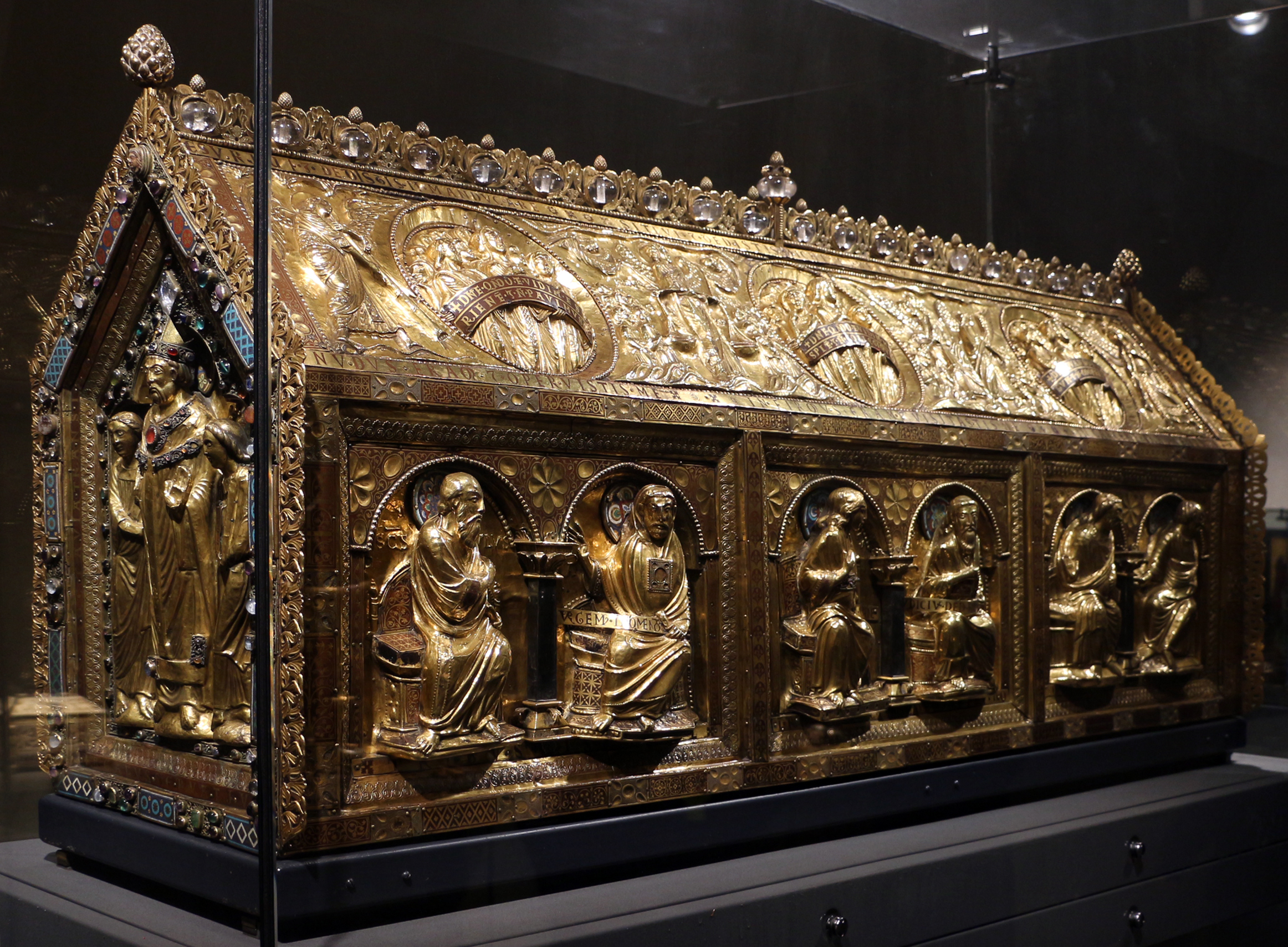
Shrine of Saint Servatius in the Treasury of the Basilica of Saint Servatius

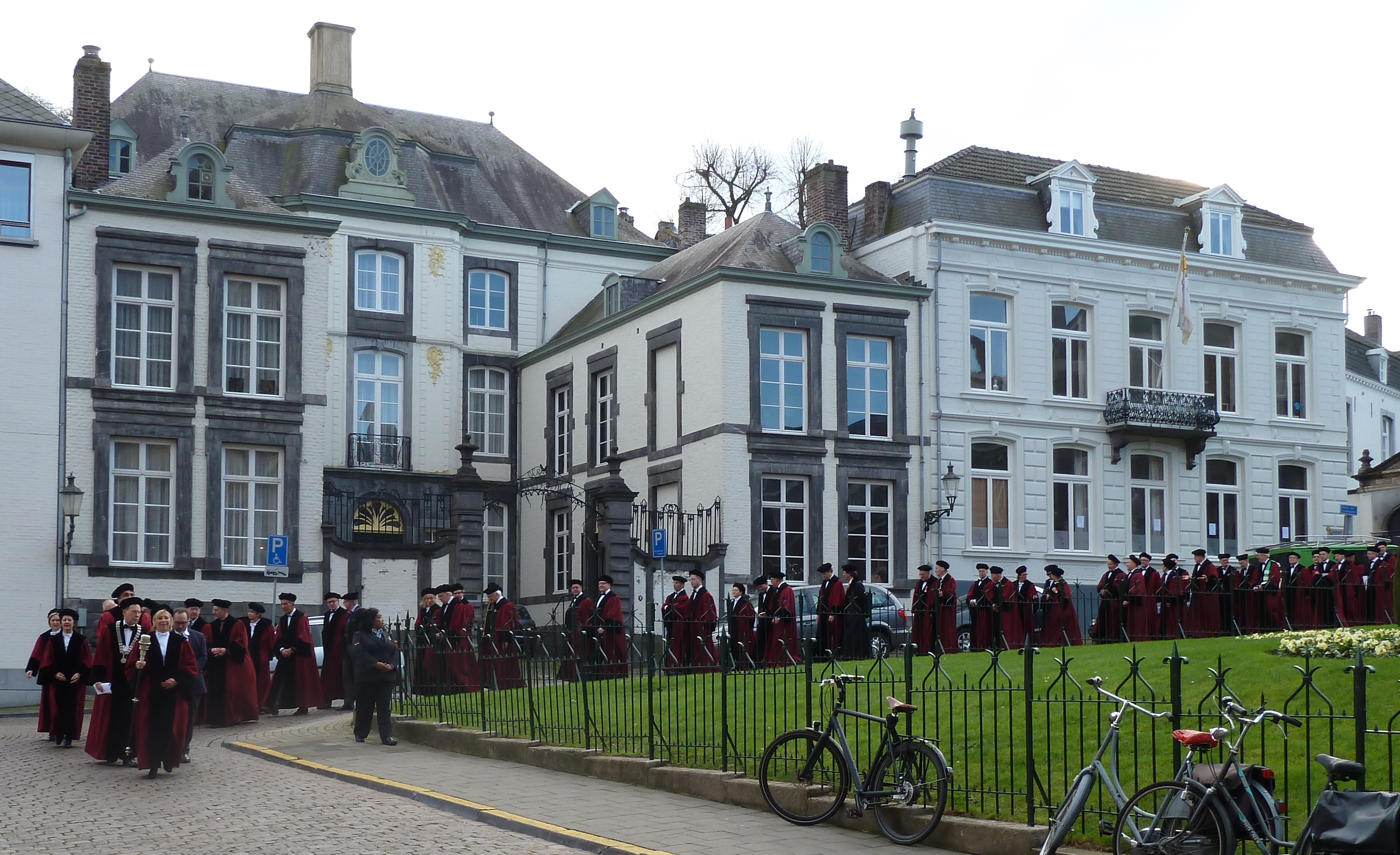
Maastricht University faculty on their way to the annual dies natalis

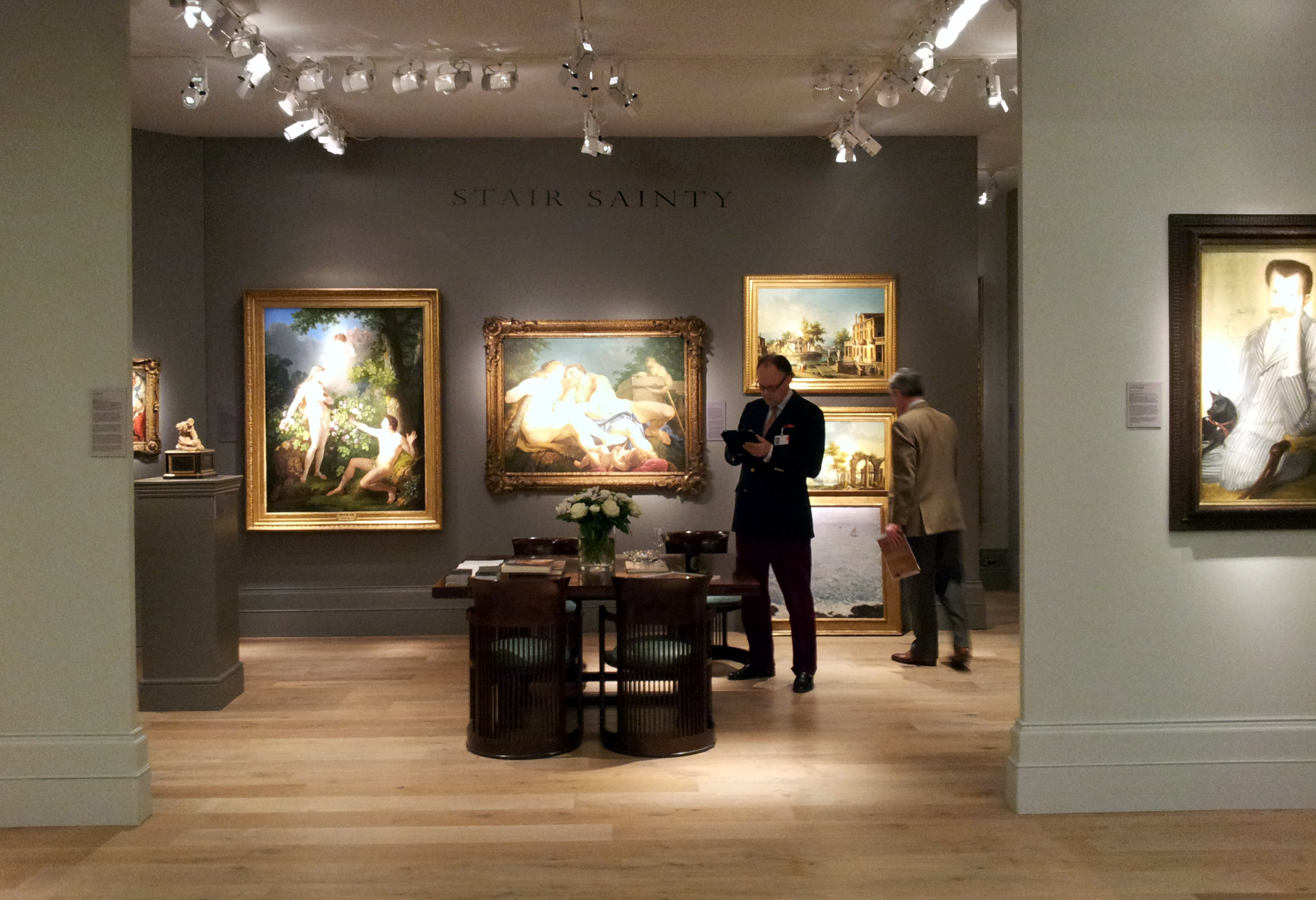
TEFAF, Maastricht's prestigious art fair

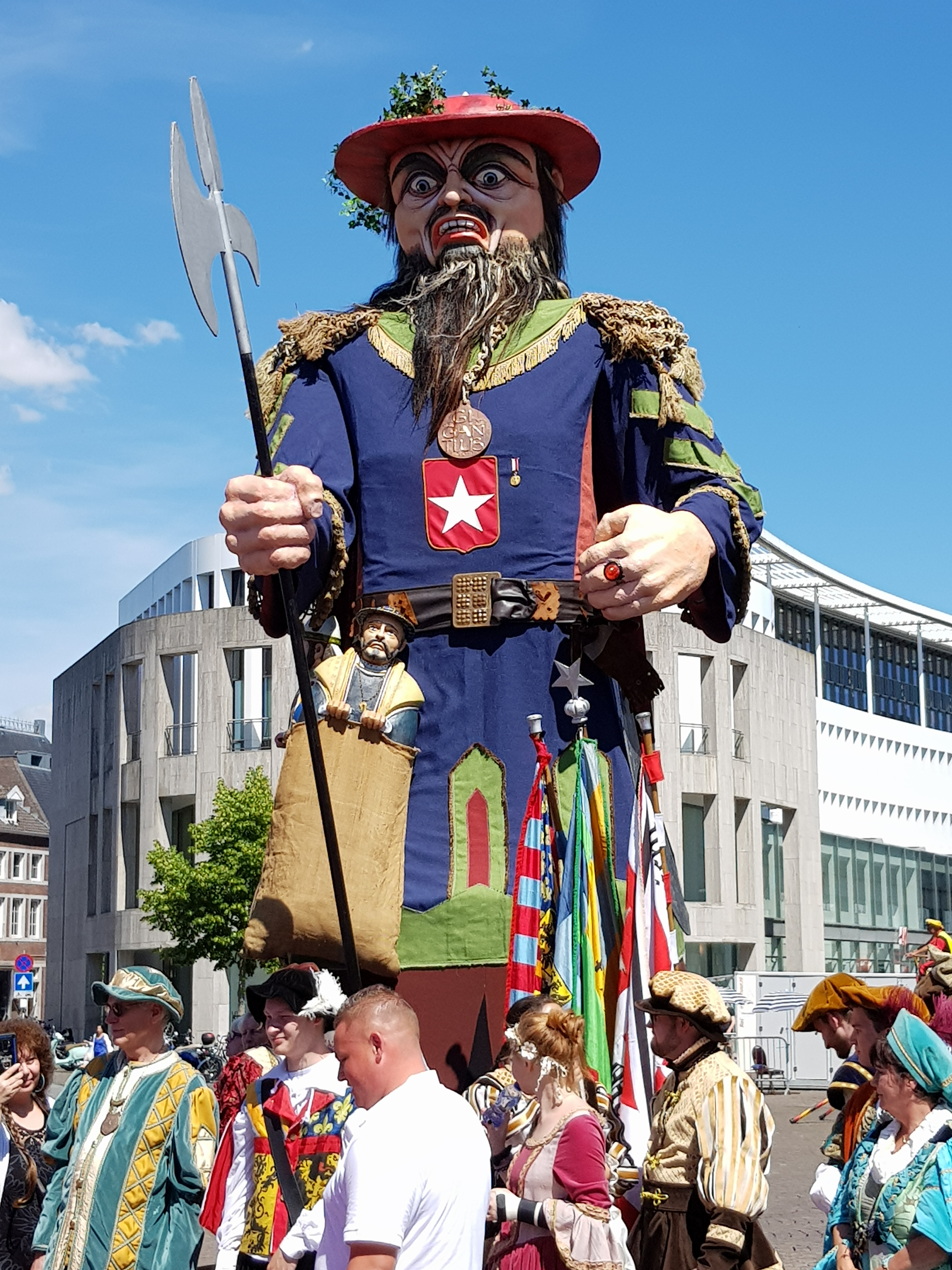
Giants' Parade, 2019: Gigantius of Maastricht

=== Sights of Maastricht ===
Maastricht is known in the Netherlands and beyond for its lively squares, narrow streets, and historic buildings. The city has 1,677 national heritage buildings (rijksmonumenten), more than any Dutch city outside Amsterdam. In addition to that there are 3,500 locally listed buildings (gemeentelijke monumenten). The entire city centre is a conservation area (beschermd stadsgezicht) and largely traffic-free. The tourist information office (VVV) is located in the basement of Dinghuis, a late-medieval courthouse overlooking Grote Staat. Maastricht's main sights include:

- Meuse (Dutch: Maas) river, with several parks and promenades along the river, and some interesting bridges:
  - Sint Servaasbrug, partly from the 13th century; the oldest bridge in the Netherlands;
  - Hoge Brug ("High Bridge"), a modern pedestrian bridge designed by René Greisch.
- City fortifications, including:
  - Remnants of the first and second medieval city wall and several towers (13th and 14th centuries);
  - Helpoort ("Hell's Gate"), an imposing gate with two towers, built around 1230, the oldest city gate in the Netherlands;
  - Wycker Waterpoort, a medieval gate in Wyck, used for accessing the city from the Meuse, demolished in the 19th century but rebuilt shortly afterwards;
  - Hoge Fronten (or: Linie van Du Moulin), remnants of 17th and 18th-century fortifications, including a number of well-preserved bastions, couvrefaces, lunettes and dry moats;
  - Fort Sint-Pieter, an early 18th-century fortress on the flanks of Mount Saint Peter, offering guided tours and panoramic views of the city; and Fort Willem I, an early 19th-century fortress on the Caberg elevation;
  - Casemates, an underground network of tunnels, built as sheltered emplacements for guns and cannons. These connected tunnels built of brick and limestone run for around fourteen kilometres underneath the city's fortifications. Guided tours are available.
- Binnenstad: inner-city pedestrianized district with popular shopping streets Grote and Kleine Staat, high-end shopping streets Stokstraat and Maastrichter Smedenstraat, and two indoor shopping centres. Several main sights in Maastricht as well as a large number of cafés, pubs and restaurants are centred around the three main squares in Binnenstad:
  - Vrijthof, the largest and possibly best-known square in Maastricht, with many well-known pubs and restaurants. Other sights include:
    - Basilica of Saint Servatius, a predominantly Romanesque church with an imposing westwork and important 12th and 13th-century sculptures; most notably the westwork interior figurative capitals, the westwork reredo, and the sculpted South Portal. The tomb of Saint Servatius in the crypt is a favoured place of pilgrimage. The church has an important church treasury;
    - Sint-Janskerk, a Gothic church dedicated to Saint John the Baptist, the city's main Protestant church since 1632, adjacent to the Basilica of Saint Servatius, with a distinctive limestone tower painted red;
    - Spaans Gouvernement ("Spanish Government Building"), a 16th-century former canon's house, later used as a residence for the Brabant and Habsburg rulers, now housing the Fotomuseum aan het Vrijthof;
    - Hoofdwacht, an 18th-century military guard house, built in the style of the Dutch Baroque, used for exhibitions;
    - Generaalshuis ("General's House"), a Neoclassical mansion, now the city's main theater (Theater aan het Vrijthof).
  - Onze Lieve Vrouweplein, a tree-lined square with a number of pavement cafes. Main sights:
    - Basilica of Our Lady, a partly 11th-century church, one of the Netherlands' most significant Romanesque buildings with an imposing Mosan westwork and an important church treasury. Perhaps best known for the shrine of Our Lady, Star of the Sea in an adjacent Gothic chapel;
    - Derlon Museumkelder, a permanent exhibition of ancient Roman remains in the basement of Hotel Derlon.
  - Markt, the town's historic market square. Sights include:
    - The Town Hall, built in the 17th century by Pieter Post and considered one of the highlights of Dutch Baroque architecture. Nearby is Dinghuis, the late medieval town hall and courthouse with an early Renaissance façade;
    - Mosae Forum, a shopping centre and civic building designed by Jo Coenen and Bruno Albert in the early 2000s. Inside the Mosae Forum parking garage there is a small exhibition of Citroën miniature cars;
    - Entre Deux, a rebuilt shopping centre in Postmodern style, which has won several international awards. It includes a bookstore located inside a former 13th-century Dominican church. In 2008, British newspaper The Guardian proclaimed this the world's most beautiful bookshop.
- Jekerkwartier, a neighbourhood named after the small river Jeker, which pops up between old houses and remnants of city walls. The western part of the neighbourhood (named the Maastricht Latin Quarter) is dominated by university buildings and (performing) arts schools. Sights include:
  - several churches and monasteries: the 13th-century First Franciscan Monastery, the 17th-century "Veiled Sisters" and Bonnefanten monasteries, and the 18th-century Second Franciscan Monastery and Walloon and Lutheran churches;
  - Maastricht Natural History Museum, a small museum of natural history in a former monastery;
  - Grote Looiersstraat ("Great Tanners' Street"), a former canal that was filled in during the 19th century, lined with elegant houses, the city's poorhouse (now part of the university library) and Sint-Maartenshofje, a typically Dutch hofje.
- Kommelkwartier, Statenkwartier and Boschstraatkwartier, three relatively quiet inner city neighbourhoods with several monasteries, university buildings and industrial heritage building:
  - Crosier Monastery in Kommelkwartier, a well-preserved Gothic monastery, now a five-star hotel;
  - Sint-Matthiaskerk, a 14th-century parish church dedicated to Saint Matthew;
  - Sphinx Quarter, an upcoming neighbourhood and cultural hotspot in the north of the city centre. Several of the industrial buildings of the former Sphinx glass, crystal and ceramics factories have been transformed for new uses;
  - Bassin, a restored early 19th-century inner harbor surrounded by industrial heritage buildings, re-used as cultural venues, bars and restaurants.
- Wyck, the old quarter on the right bank of the river Meuse.
  - Saint Martin's Church, a Gothic Revival church designed by Pierre Cuypers in 1856;
  - Rechtstraat and Hoogbrugstraat are the oldest streets in Wyck with many historic buildings and a mix of specialty shops, art galleries and restaurants;
  - Stationsstraat and Wycker Brugstraat are elegant streets with the majority of the buildings dating from the late 19th century. At the east end of Stationsstraat stands the Maastricht railway station from 1913.
- Céramique, a modern neighbourhood on the site of the former Société Céramique potteries, including a park along the river Meuse (Charles Eyckpark) and a showcase of architectural highlights:
  - Wiebengahal, one of the few remaining industrial buildings in the neighbourhood and an early example of modernist architecture in the Netherlands, dating from 1912;
  - Bonnefanten Museum by Aldo Rossi, featuring a landmark rocket-shaped tower;
  - Centre Céramique, a public library and exhibition space by Jo Coenen;
  - La Fortezza, a red brick office and apartment building by Mario Botta;
  - Siza Tower, a residential tower clad with zinc and white marble, by Álvaro Siza Vieira;
  - Other buildings in Céramique by MBM, Cruz y Ortiz, Luigi Snozzi, Aurelio Galfetti, Herman Hertzberger, Wiel Arets, Hubert-Jan Henket, Charles Vandenhove and Bob Van Reeth.
- Sint-Pietersberg ("Mount Saint Peter"): modest hill and nature reserve south of the city, peaking at 171 metres (561 ft) above sea level. It serves as Maastricht's main recreation area and a viewing point. The main sights include:
  - Fort Sint-Pieter, an early 18th-century military fortress fully restored in recent years;
  - Caves of Maastricht aka Grotten Sint-Pietersberg, an underground network of man-made tunnels ("caves") in limestone quarries. Guided tours are available;
  - ENCI Quarry: a former quarry and nature reserve with several lakes, accessible via a spectacular staircase with viewing platforms;
  - Slavante, a 19th-century former gentlemen's club on the site of a Franciscan monastery (of which parts are still standing), now a popular hang-out, offering panoramic views over the Meuse valley;
  - Lichtenberg, a ruined medieval castle keep and an adjacent 18th-century farmstead;
  - D'n Observant ("The Observer"), an artificial hilltop, made with the spoils of a nearby quarry, now a nature reserve.

=== Museums in Maastricht ===
- Bonnefanten Museum is the foremost museum for old masters and contemporary fine art in the province of Limburg. The collection features medieval sculpture (The Virgin and Child with St. Anne), early Italian painting (Giovanni del Biondo, Domenico di Michelino, Jacopo del Casentino, Sano di Pietro, Pietro Nelli), Southern Netherlandish and German Renaissance painting (Colijn de Coter, Roelandt Savery, Pieter Coecke van Aelst, Pieter Brueghel the Younger, Lucas Cranach the Elder), and contemporary art (Sol LeWitt, Robert Mangold, Richard Serra, Luciano Fabro, Marcel Broodthaers, Joseph Beuys, Neo Rauch, Gilbert and George, Peter Doig, Gary Hume, Grayson Perry, Luc Tuymans, Ai Weiwei).
- The Treasury of the Basilica of Saint Servatius includes religious artifacts from the 4th to 20th centuries, notably those related to Saint Servatius. Highlights include the shrine, the key and the crosier of Saint Servatius, and the reliquary bust donated by Alexander Farnese, Duke of Parma.
- The Treasury of the Basilica of Our Lady contains religious art, textiles, reliquaries, liturgical vessels and other artifacts from the Middle Ages and later periods.
- Derlon Museumkelder is a preserved archeological site in the basement of a hotel with Roman and pre-Roman remains.
- The Maastricht Natural History Museum exhibits collections relating to the geology, paleontology and flora and fauna of Limburg. Highlights in the collection are several fragment of skeletons of Mosasaurs found in a quarry in Mount Saint Peter.
- Fotomuseum aan het Vrijthof is a local museum of photography housed in the 16th-century Spanish Government building, featuring some period rooms and temporary exhibitions of photographers.

=== Events and festivals ===
- Dies natalis, birthday of the University of Maastricht, with procession of university faculty to St. John's Church where honorary degrees are awarded (9 January).
- Carnival (Maastrichtian: Vastelaovend) - a traditional three-day festival in the southern part of the Netherlands; in Maastricht mainly outdoors with typical Zaate Herremeniekes (February/March).
- The European Fine Art Fair (TEFAF), the world's leading art and antiques fair (March).
- Tattoo Expo Maastricht, an anunual international tattoo exhibition (March).
- Amstel Gold Race, an international cycling race which starts in Maastricht (usually April).
- KunstTour, an annual art festival (May).
- European Model United Nations (EuroMUN), an annual international conference (May).
- Stadsprocessie, religious procession with reliquaries of Saint Servatius and other local saints (first Sunday after 13 May).
- Pilgrimage of the Relics (Dutch: Heiligdomsvaart), pilgrimage with relics display and processions dating from the Middle Ages (May/June; once in 7 years; next: 2032).
- Giants' Parade (Dutch: Reuzenstoet), parade of processional giants, mainly from Belgium and France (June; once in 5 years; next: 2024).
- Maastrichts Mooiste, an annual running and walking event (June).
- Fashionclash, international fashion event throughout the city (June).
- Vrijthof concerts by André Rieu and the Johann Strauss Orchestra (July/August).
- Preuvenemint, a large culinary event held on the Vrijthof square (August).
- Inkom, the traditional opening of the academic year and introduction for new students of Maastricht University (August).
- Musica Sacra, a festival of religious (classical) music (September).
- Nederlandse Dansdagen (Netherlands Dance Days), a modern dance festival (October).
- Jazz Maastricht, a jazz festival formerly known as Jeker Jazz (autumn).
- 11de van de 11de (the 11th of the 11th), the official start of the carnival season (11 November).
- Jumping Indoor Maastricht, an international concours hippique (showjumping) (November).
- Magic Maastricht (Magisch Maastricht), a winter-themed funfair and Christmas market held on Vrijthof square and other locations throughout the city (December/January).

Furthermore, the Maastricht Exposition and Congress Centre (MECC) hosts many events throughout the year.

== Nature ==
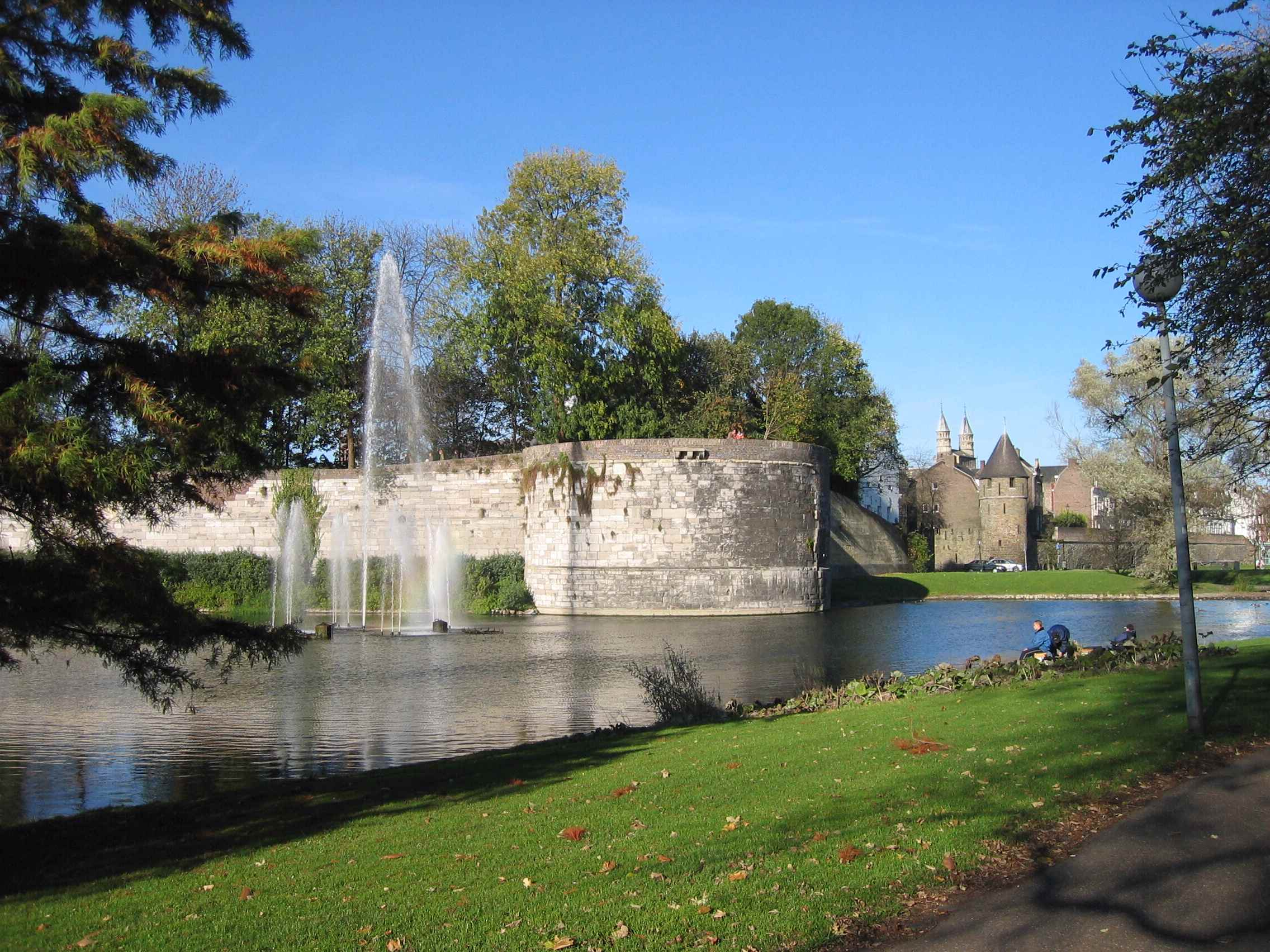
A pond in Stadspark, Maastricht's main park

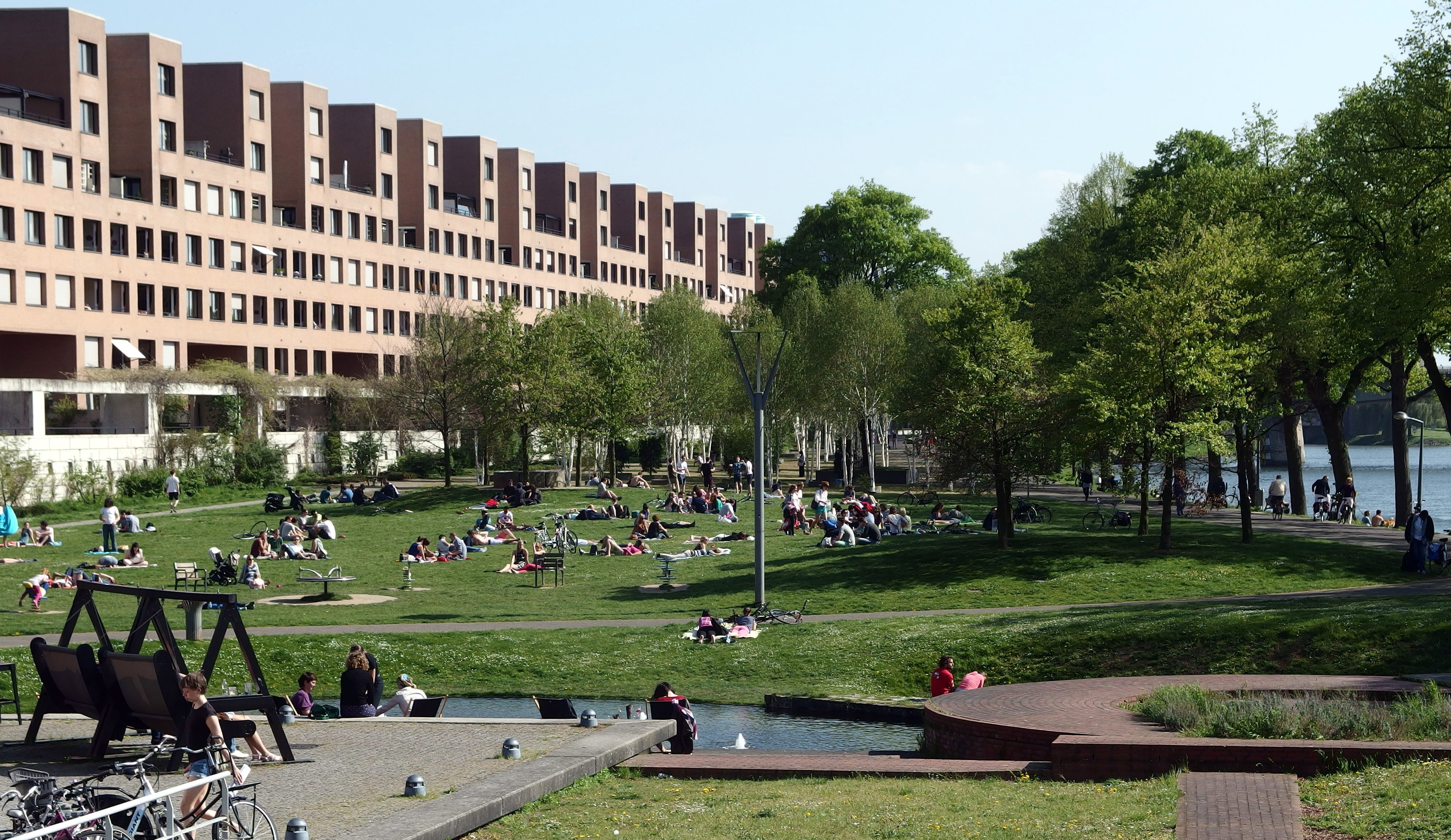
Relaxing in Charles Eyckpark

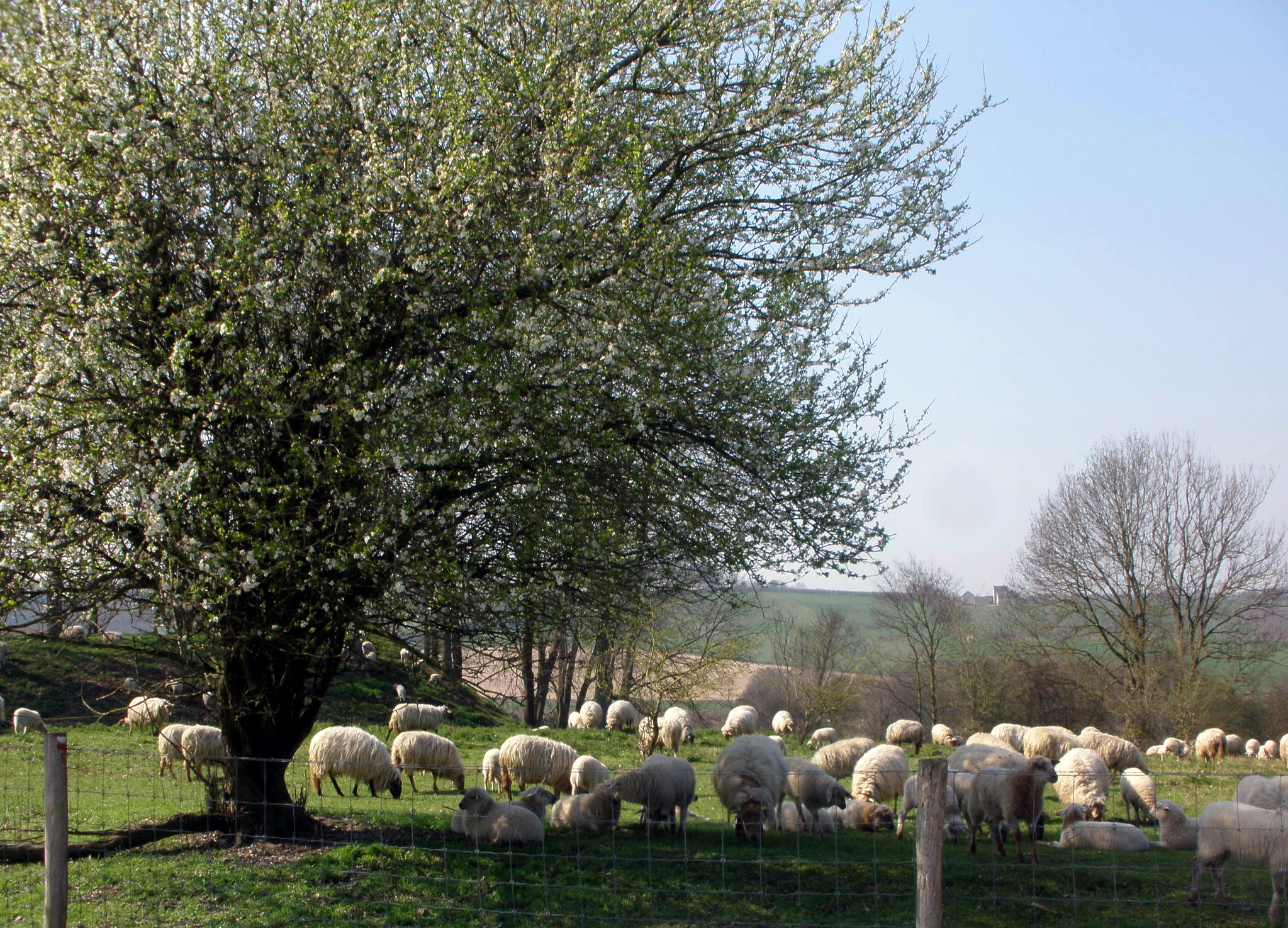
Sheep on Mount Saint Peter

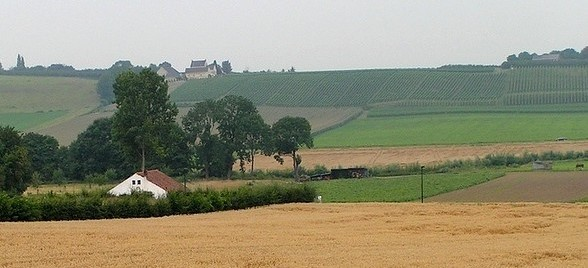
Jeker valley with vineyards

=== Parks ===
There are several city parks and recreational areas in Maastricht:

- Stadspark, the main public park in Maastricht, partly 19th-century, with remnants of the medieval city walls, a branch of the Jeker river, a mini-zoo and several public sculptures (e.g. the statue of d'Artagnan in Aldenhofpark, a 20th-century extension of Stadspark). Other extensions of the park are called Kempland, Henri Hermanspark, Monseigneur Nolenspark and Waldeckpark. From 2014 onwards, the grounds of the former Tapijn military barracks will be gradually added to the park;
- Jekerpark, a new park along the river Jeker, separated from Stadspark by a busy road;
- Frontenpark, a new park west of the city centre, incorporating parts of the fortifications of Maastricht from the 17th to 19th centuries;
- Charles Eykpark, a modern park between the public library and Bonnefanten Museum on the east bank of the Meuse river, designed in the late 1990s by Swedish landscape architect Gunnar Martinsson.
- Griendpark, a modern park on the east bank of the river with an inline-skating and skateboarding course.
- Geusseltpark in eastern Maastricht and J.J. van de Vennepark in western Maastricht, both with elaborate sports facilities.

=== Natural areas ===
- The Meuse river and its green banks in outlying areas. In the northern areas around Itteren and Borgharen 'new nature' is being created in combination with river protection measures and gravel mining.
- Pietersplas, an artificial lake between Maastricht and Gronsveld that was the result of gravel pits on the banks of the Meuse river. There is a beach on the northern slope of the lake and a marina near Castle Hoogenweerth. The eastern riverbed between Pietersplas and the provincial government building is a nature reserve (Kleine Weerd).
- The Jeker Valley, along the river Jeker, starts near the city centre in Stadspark and leads via Jekerpark to an area with green meadows, fertile fields, some vineyards on the slopes of Cannerberg, several water mills and Château Neercanne, and continues further south into Belgium.
- The green flanks of Mount Saint Peter, including many footpaths.
- Dousberg and Zouwdal, a modest hill and valley surrounded by urban development on the western edge of the city, partly in Belgium. A large part of the hill is now in use as an international golf course (Golfclub Maastricht).
- Landgoederenzone, an extended area in the northeast of Maastricht (partly in Meerssen) consisting of around fifteen country estates, such as Severen, Geusselt, Bethlehem, Mariënwaard, Kruisdonk, Vaeshartelt, Meerssenhoven, Borgharen and Hartelstein. Some of the castles, villas and stately homes are surrounded by industrial areas or quarries.
- Bike paths through agricultural areas in several outlying quarters (like "Biesland" and "Wolder").

== Sports ==
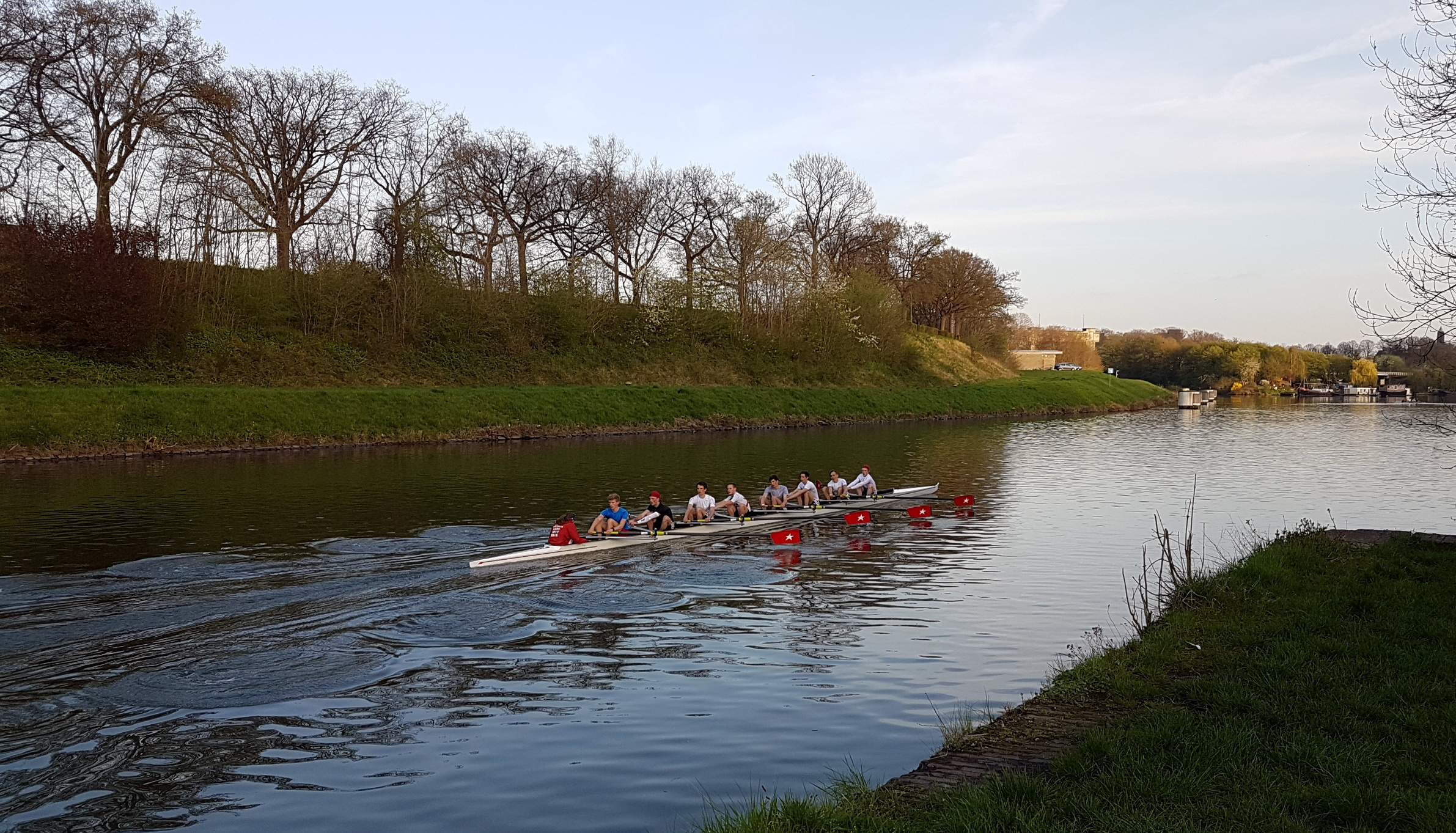
Student rowing club MSRV Saurus in Zuid-Willemsvaart

- In football, Maastricht is represented by MVV Maastricht (Dutch: Maatschappelijke Voetbal Vereniging Maastricht), who (as of the 2016–2017 season) play in the Dutch first division of the national competition (which is the second league after the Eredivisie league). MVV's home is the Geusselt stadium near the A2 highway.
- Maastricht is also home to the Maastricht Wildcats, an American Football League team and member of the AFBN (American Football Bond Nederland).
- Since 1998, Maastricht has been the traditional starting place of the annual Amstel Gold Race, the only Dutch cycling classic. For several years the race also finished in Maastricht, but since 2002 the finale has been in the municipality of Valkenburg. Tom Dumoulin was born in Maastricht.
- Since 2000, Maastricht has been the first city in the Netherlands with a Lacrosse team. The Student Sport Association "Maaslax" is closely linked to Maastricht University and a member of the NLB (Nederlandse Lacrosse Bond).

== Politics ==
=== City council ===
Parties	2018	2022	2026
D66	5	4	6
CDA	5	4	6
GroenLinks	5	4	4
Senioren Partij Maastricht (SPM)	5	5	3
VVD	3	3	3
Labour (PvdA)	3	4	3
Volt	–	2	2
Maastricht Today	–	–	2
Forum for Democracy (FvD)	–	1	2
SP	3	2	2
50PLUS (50+)	1	1	1
Party for Freedom (PVV)	2	1	1
Party for the Animals (PvdD)	–	2	1
Partij Veilig Maastricht	3	3	1
M:OED	2	1	1
Sociaal Actieve Burgerpartij (SAB)	1	1	1
Liberale Partij Maastricht (LPM)	1	1	–
Total	39	39	39

The municipal government of Maastricht consists of a city council, a mayor and a number of aldermen. The city council, a 39-member administrative body directly elected every four years, appoints the aldermen on the basis of a coalition agreement between two or more parties after each election.

=== Aldermen and mayors ===
The mayor and aldermen make up the executive branch of the municipal government.

The mayor from 2002, Gerd Leers (CDA), resigned in January 2010 following allegations of irregularities in a holiday villa project in Bulgaria owned by Leers. He was replaced by Onno Hoes, a Liberal (VVD), the only male mayor in the country officially married to a man. In 2013 Hoes was subject to controversy after disclosures of intimate affairs with several other men, although he remained mayor. After a new affair in 2014, Hoes eventually stepped down.

From July 2015, Annemarie Penn-te Strake became mayor. She was an independent serving no political party, although her husband was a former chairman of the Maastricht Seniorenpartij. She had served in the Dutch judicial system for many years, and during her tenure as mayor she still served as attorney general. In July 2023 Wim Hillenaar (CDA) took over as mayor.

=== Cannabis ===
One controversial issue which dominated Maastricht politics for many years was the city's approach to soft drugs. Under the Dutch soft drug policy, individuals may buy cannabis from 'coffeeshops' under certain conditions. From the 1980s, Maastricht saw a growing influx of 'drug tourists', mainly from neighbouring Belgium, France and Germany. The city government attempted to reduce negative aspects, including illegal sale of hard drugs in the city centre and anti-social behaviour.

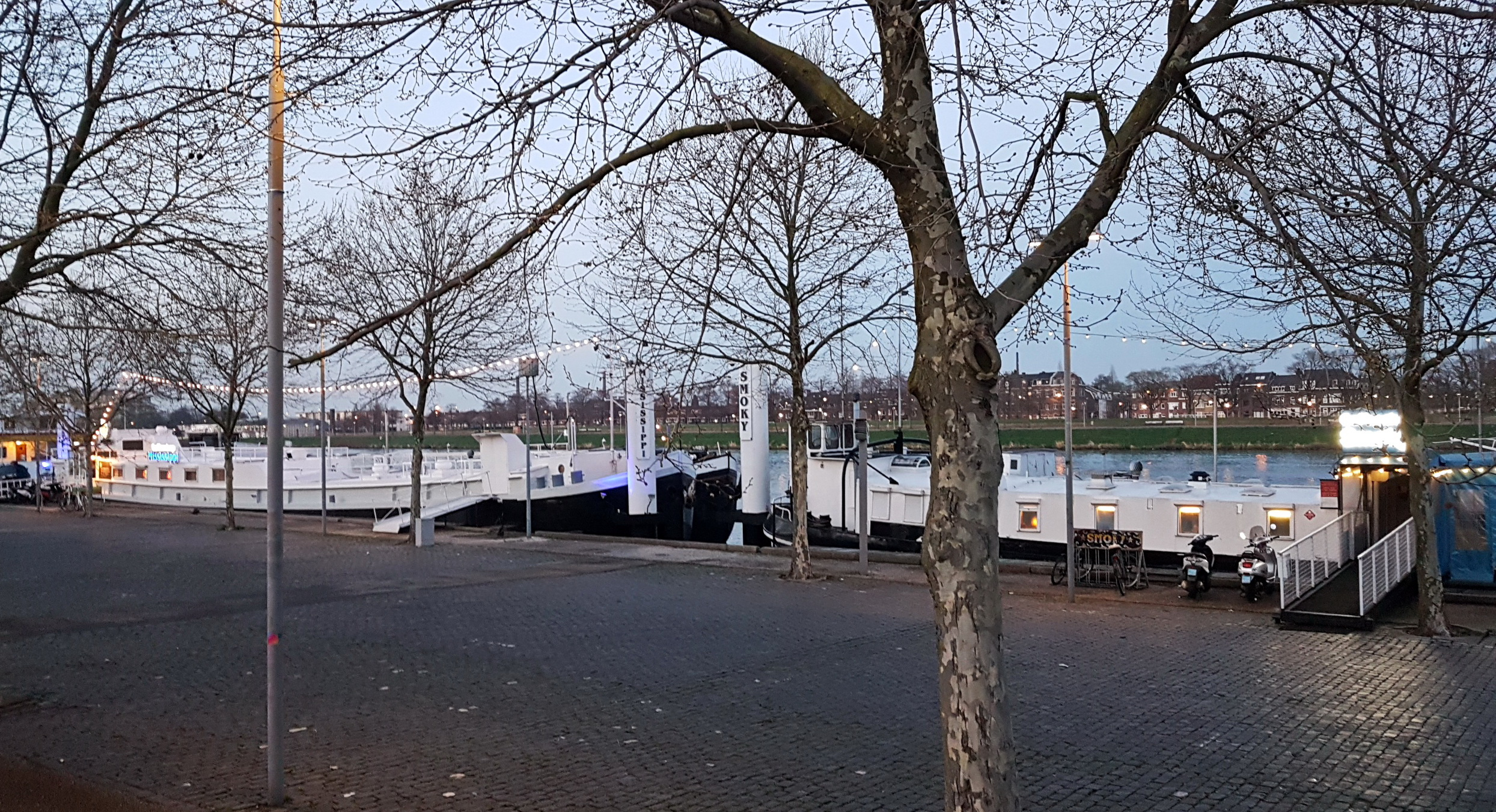
Two 'coffeeshop' boats at Maasboulevard

A 2008 proposal to relocate the coffeeshops to the outskirts of the city was opposed by neighbouring municipalities (some in Belgium) and by the Dutch and Belgian parliaments. In December 2010, a Maastricht law to restrict entry to coffeeshops to local residents was upheld by the Court of Justice of the European Union, with the Dutch government introducing a similar national law in 2012. The new system led to a reduction in drug tourism in Maastricht's cannabis shops, but an increase in drug dealing on the streets. A 2018 Maastricht University study showed a substantial decline in drug nuisance since 2012, although criminal drug networks had grown due to police budget cuts.

== Transport ==
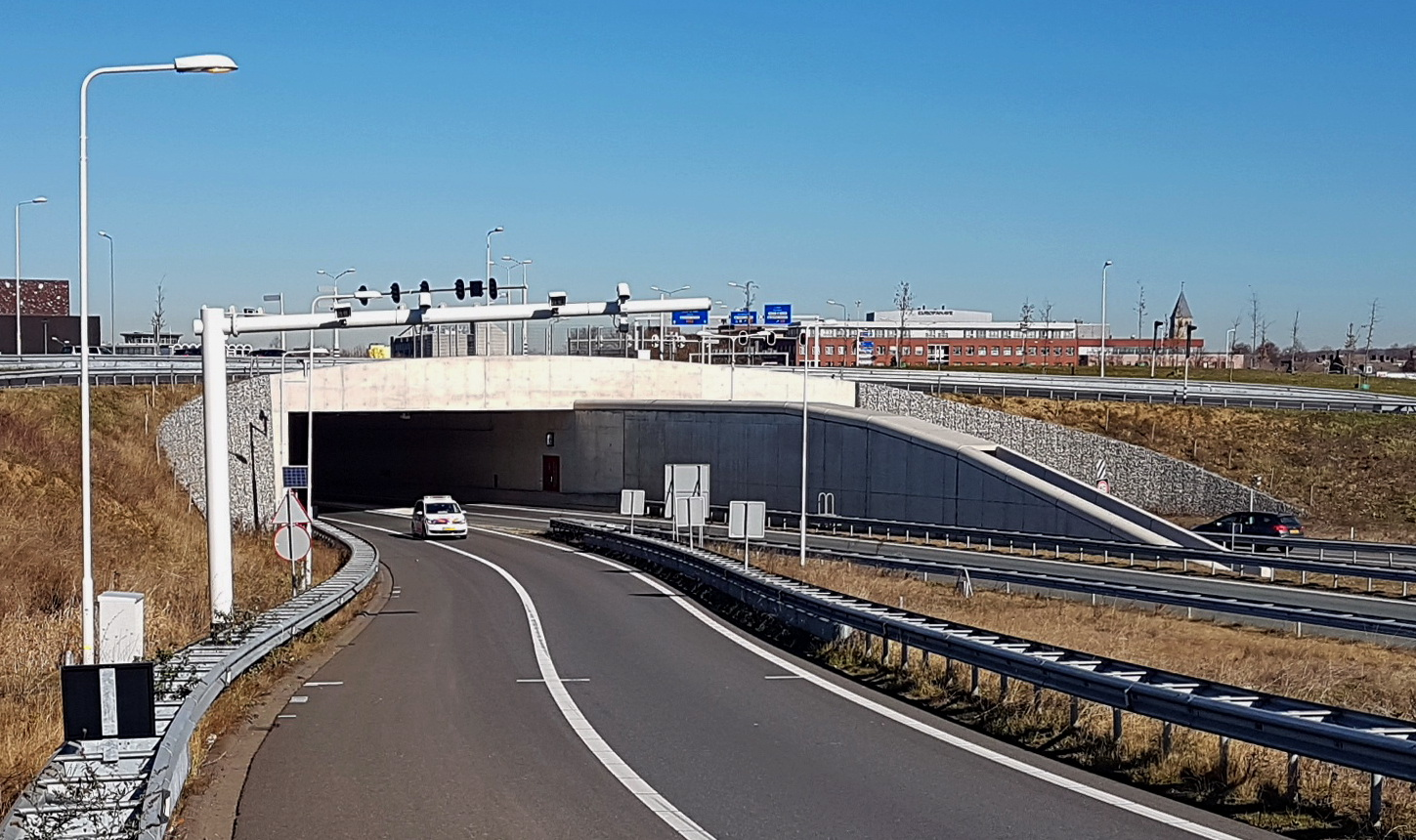
A2 motorway and Koning Willem-Alexandertunnel

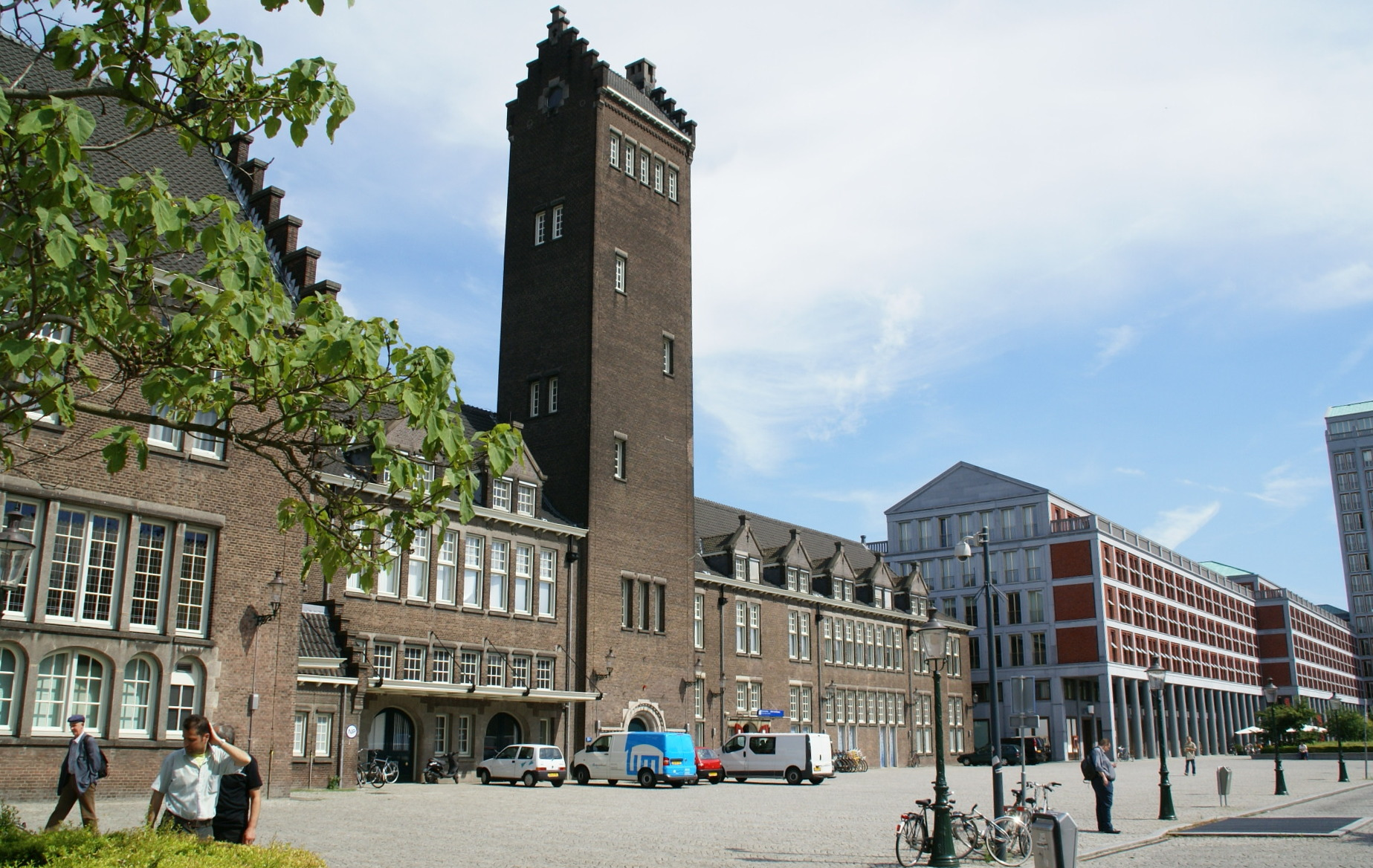
Maastricht main railway station

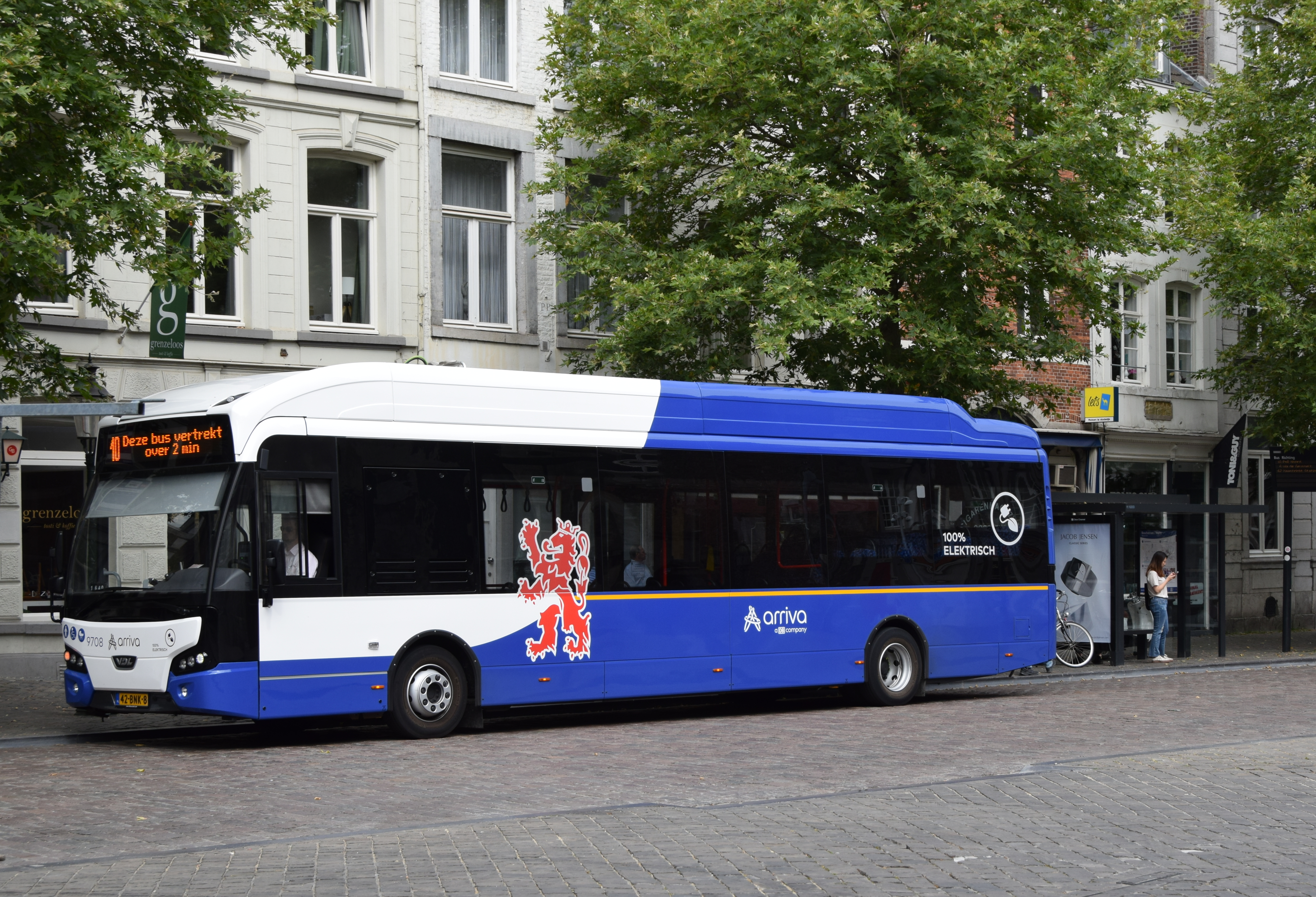
Arriva bus at Boschstraat

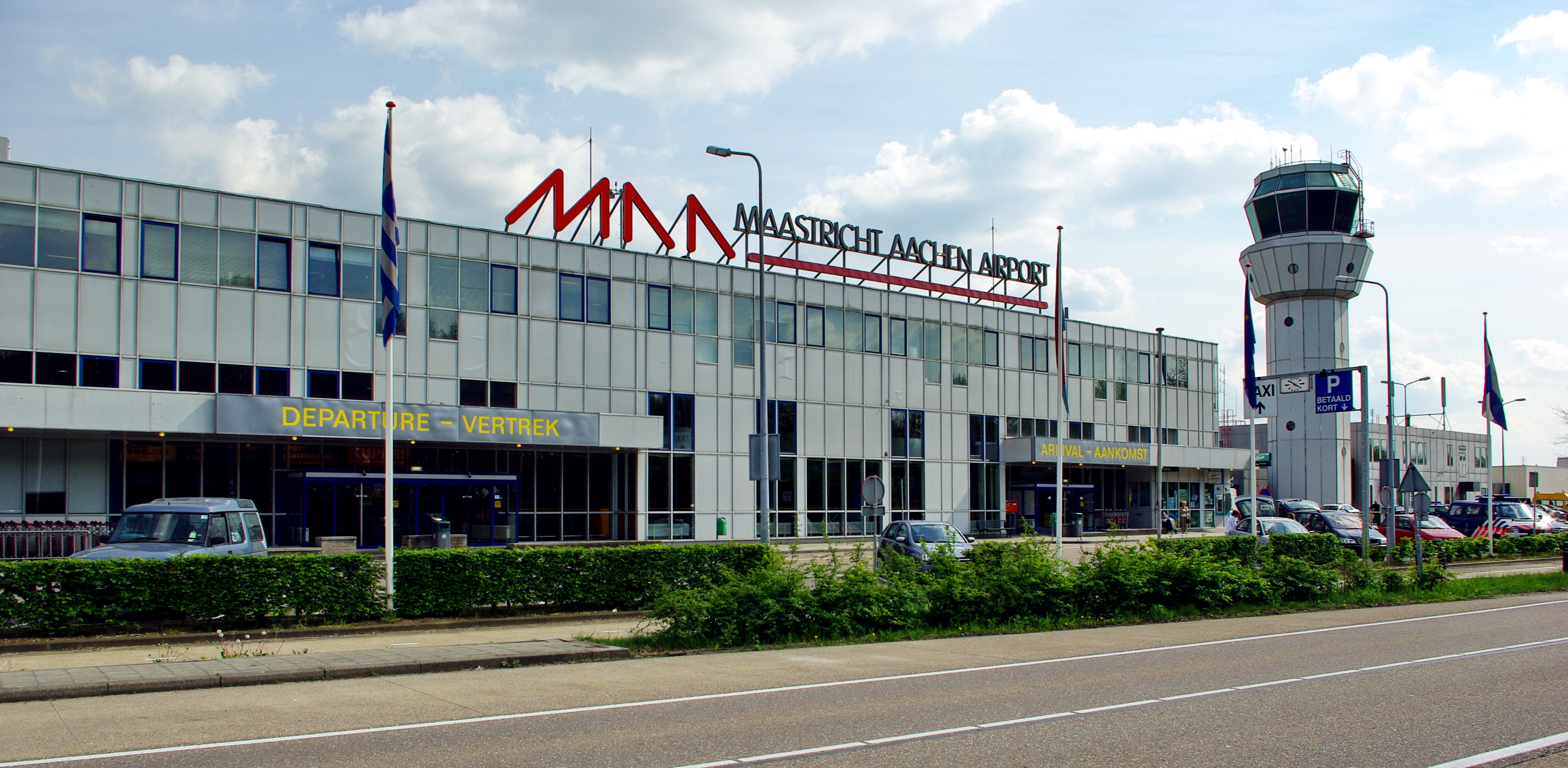
Maastricht Aachen Airport

=== By bike ===
Maastricht is bikeable. People biking are able to cross the river using every bridge in the city.

=== By car ===
Maastricht is served by the A2 and A79 motorways. The city can be reached from Brussels and Cologne in approximately one hour and from Amsterdam in about two and a half hours.

The A2 motorway runs through Maastricht in a double-decked tunnel. Before 2016, the A2 motorway ran through the city; heavily congested, it caused air pollution in the urban area. Construction of a two-level tunnel designed to solve these problems started in 2011 and was opened (in stages) by December 2016.

In spite of several large underground car parks, parking in the city centre forms a major problem during weekends and bank holidays because of the large numbers of visitors. Parking fees are deliberately high to encourage visitors to use public transport or park and ride facilities away from the centre.

=== By train ===
Maastricht is served by three rail operators, all of which call at the main Maastricht railway station near the centre and two of which call at the smaller Maastricht Randwyck, near the business and university district. Only Arriva also calls at Maastricht Noord, which opened in 2013. Intercity trains northwards to Amsterdam, Eindhoven, Den Bosch and Utrecht are operated by Dutch Railways. The line to Heerlen, Valkenburg and Kerkrade is operated by Arriva. The National Railway Company of Belgium runs south to Liège in Belgium. The westbound railway to Hasselt (Belgium) closed in 1954. The former railway to Aachen was closed down in the 1980s. However, Aachen can still be reached via Heerlen.

=== By bus ===
Regular bus lines connect the city centre, outer areas, business districts and railway stations. The regional Arriva bus network extends to most parts of South Limburg and Aachen (Germany). Regional buses by De Lijn connect Maastricht with Hasselt, Tongeren and Maasmechelen, and one bus connects Maastricht with Liège, operated by TEC. FlixBus provides intercity bus services from Maastricht to many European destinations.

=== By air ===
Maastricht is served by the nearby Maastricht Aachen Airport (IATA: MST, ICAO: EHBK), in nearby Beek, and it is informally referred to by that name. The airport is located about 10 kilometres (6 miles) north of the city centre. The airport is primarily served by low-cost airline Wizz Air. The nearest airports are both located in nearby Germany which are Düsseldorf Airport, located 112 km (70 mi) north east and Cologne Bonn Airport, located 117 km (73 mi) east of Maastricht. However, residents in the city also use Amsterdam Schiphol Airport as an international hub. The airport is located 217 km (135 mi) north west of the city. Maastricht has an area control centre for air traffic 24,500 feet (7,500 m) in altitude and above over Benelux and northwest Germany.

=== By boat ===
Maastricht has a river port (Beatrixhaven) and is connected by water with Belgium and the rest of the Netherlands through the river Meuse, the Juliana Canal, the Albert Canal and the Zuid-Willemsvaart. Although there are no regular boat connections to other cities, various organized boat trips for tourists connect Maastricht with Belgium cities such as Liège.

=== Distances to other cities ===
These distances are as the crow flies and so do not represent actual overland distances.

- (Belgium) Liège: 25.5 km (15.8 mi) south
- (Germany) Aachen: 31.0 km (19.3 mi) east
- (Netherlands) Eindhoven: 66.8 km (41.5 mi) north-west
- (Germany) Düsseldorf: 86.2 km (53.6 mi) north-east
- (Germany) Cologne: 89.6 km (55.7 mi) east
- (Belgium) Brussels: 95.1 km (59.1 mi) west
- (Belgium) Antwerp: 97.8 km (60.8 mi) north-west
- (Germany) Bonn: 99.9 km (62.1 mi) south-east
- (Belgium) Charleroi: 102.1 km (63.4 mi) south-west
- (Belgium) Mons: 130.8 km (81.3 mi) south-west
- Luxembourg City: 141.4 km (87.9 mi) south
- (Belgium) Ghent: 141.5 km (87.9 mi) west
- (Netherlands) Utrecht: 142.4 km (88.5 mi) north-west
- (Netherlands) Rotterdam: 144.5 km (89.8 mi) north-west
- (Netherlands) Amsterdam: 175.1 km (108.8 mi) north-west
- (France) Lille: 186.3 km (115.8 mi) west
- (Germany) Frankfurt am Main: 228.8 km (142.2 mi) south-east
- (Netherlands) Groningen: 269.6 km (167.5 mi) north
- (France) Strasbourg: 288.7 km (179.4 mi) south-east
- (France) Paris: 325.6 km (202.3 mi) south-west
- (Germany) Hannover: 325.7 km (202.4 mi) north-east
- (Germany) Stuttgart: 341.3 km (212.1 mi) south-east
- (Switzerland) Basel: 390.2 km (242.5 mi) south-east
- (United Kingdom) London: 411.5 km (255.7 mi) north-west
- (Switzerland) Zürich: 438.7 km (272.6 mi) south-east

== Education ==
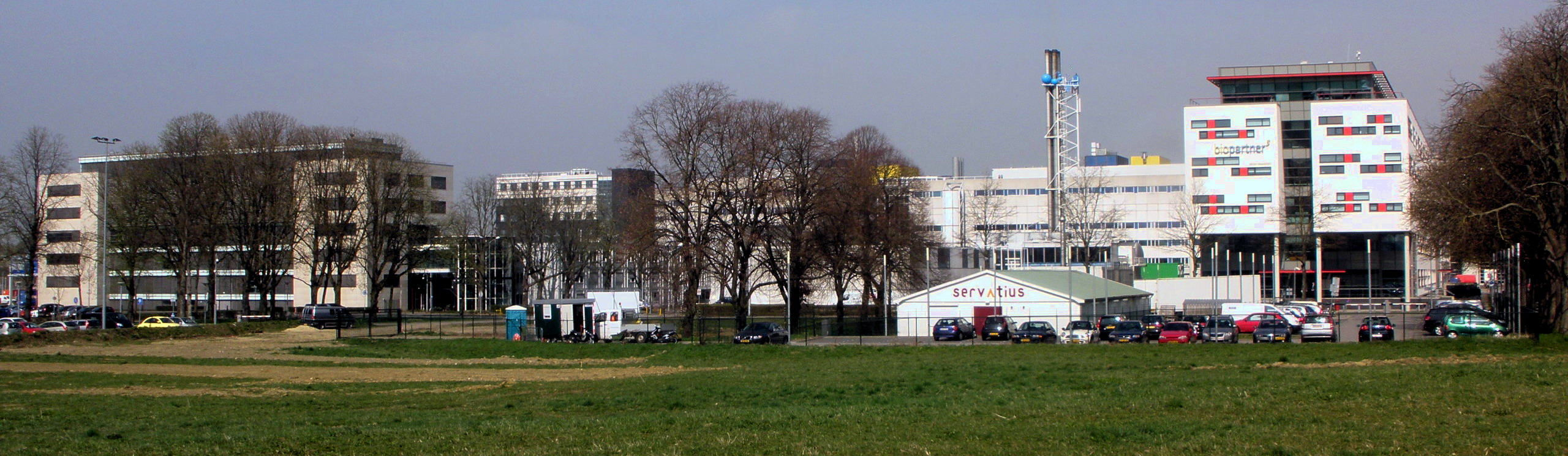
Maastricht University, Campus Randwyck

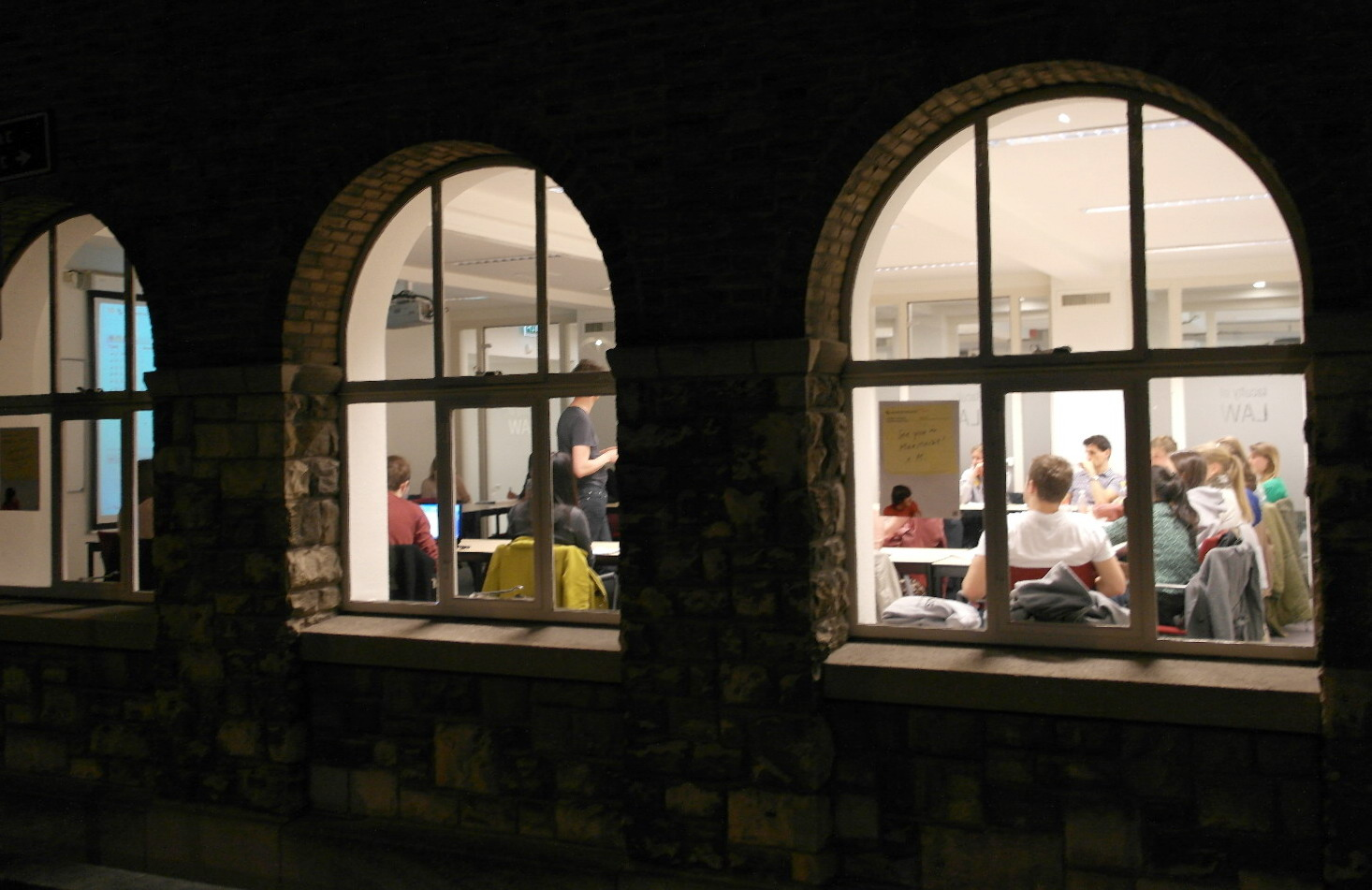
Students at work at UM Law School

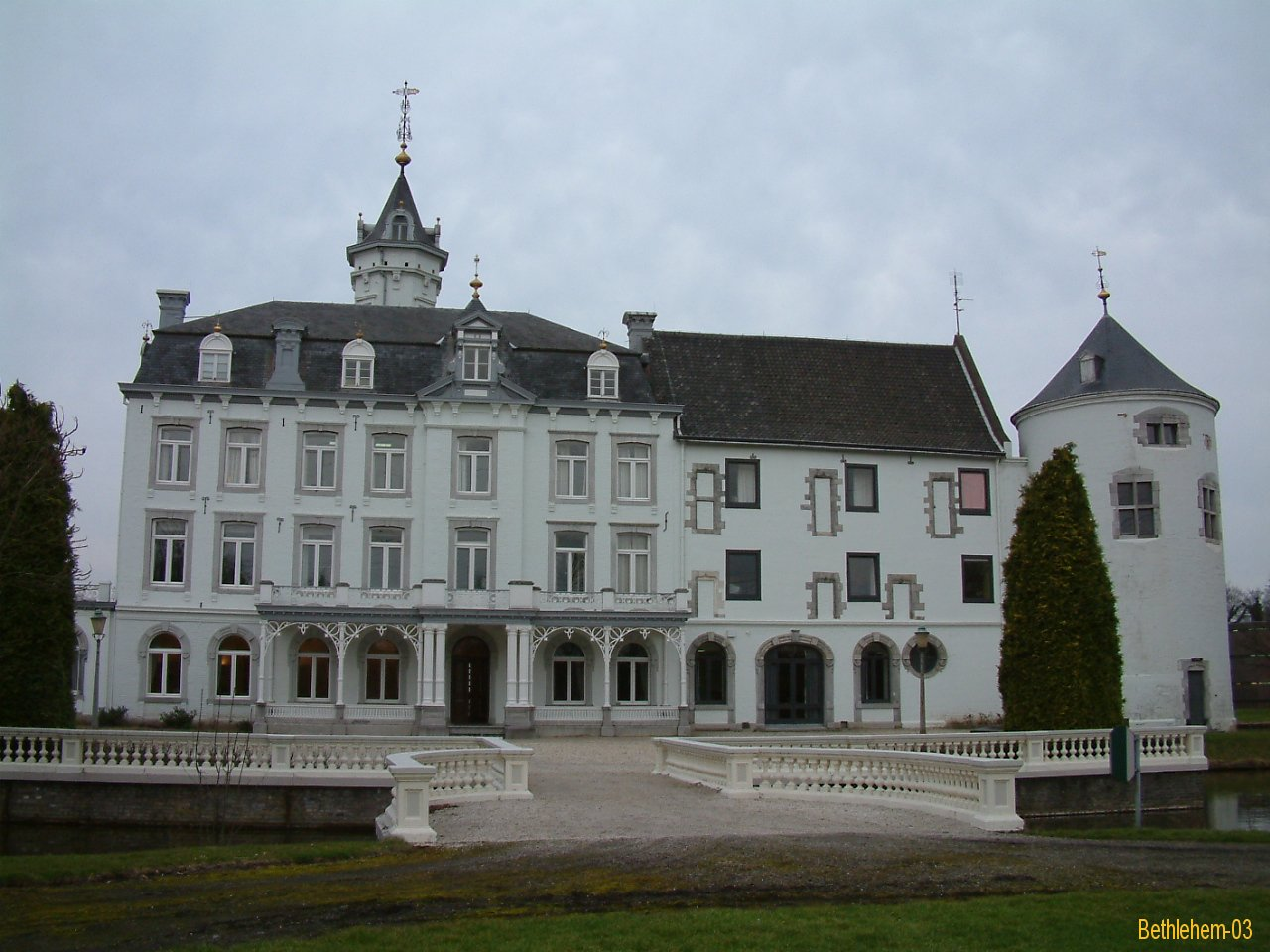
Hotel Management School at Bethlehem Castle

=== Secondary education ===
- Bernard Lievegoedschool (Anthroposophical education)
- Bonnefantencollege
- Porta Mosana College
- Sint-Maartenscollege
- United World College Maastricht

=== Tertiary education ===
- Maastricht University (Dutch: Universiteit Maastricht or UM) including:
  - University College Maastricht
  - Maastricht School of Management (merged with UM in 2022)
- Zuyd University of Applied Sciences (Dutch: Hogeschool Zuyd, also has departments in Sittard and Heerlen) including:
  - Academy for Dramatic Arts Maastricht (Dutch: Toneelacademie Maastricht)
  - School of Fine Arts Maastricht (Dutch: Academie Beeldende Kunsten Maastricht)
  - Maastricht Academy of Music (Dutch: Conservatorium Maastricht)
  - Academy of architecture
  - Faculty of International Business and Communication
  - Maastricht Hotel Management School
- Teikyo University (Maastricht campus closed in 2007)

=== Other ===
- Jan Van Eyck Academie - post-academic art institute
- Berlitz Language School Maastricht
- Talenacademie Nederland

== International relations ==
=== Twin towns ===
Maastricht is twinned with:

Chengdu, China (since 2012); El Rama, Nicaragua	Koblenz, Germany; Liège, Belgium

== Notable people ==
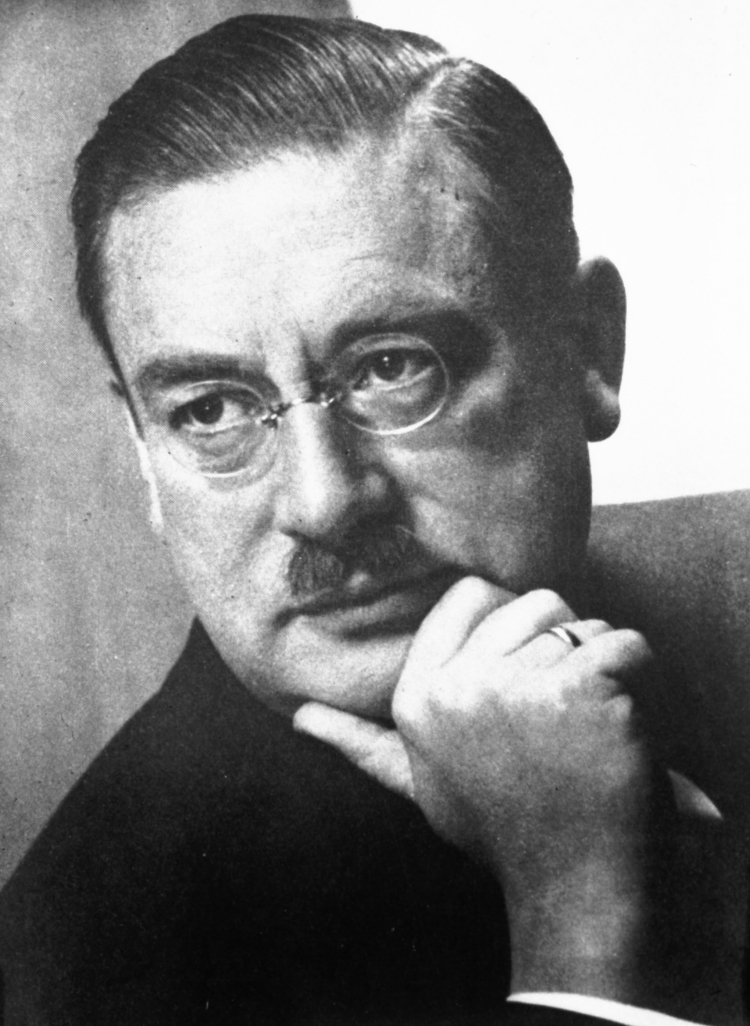
Peter Debye

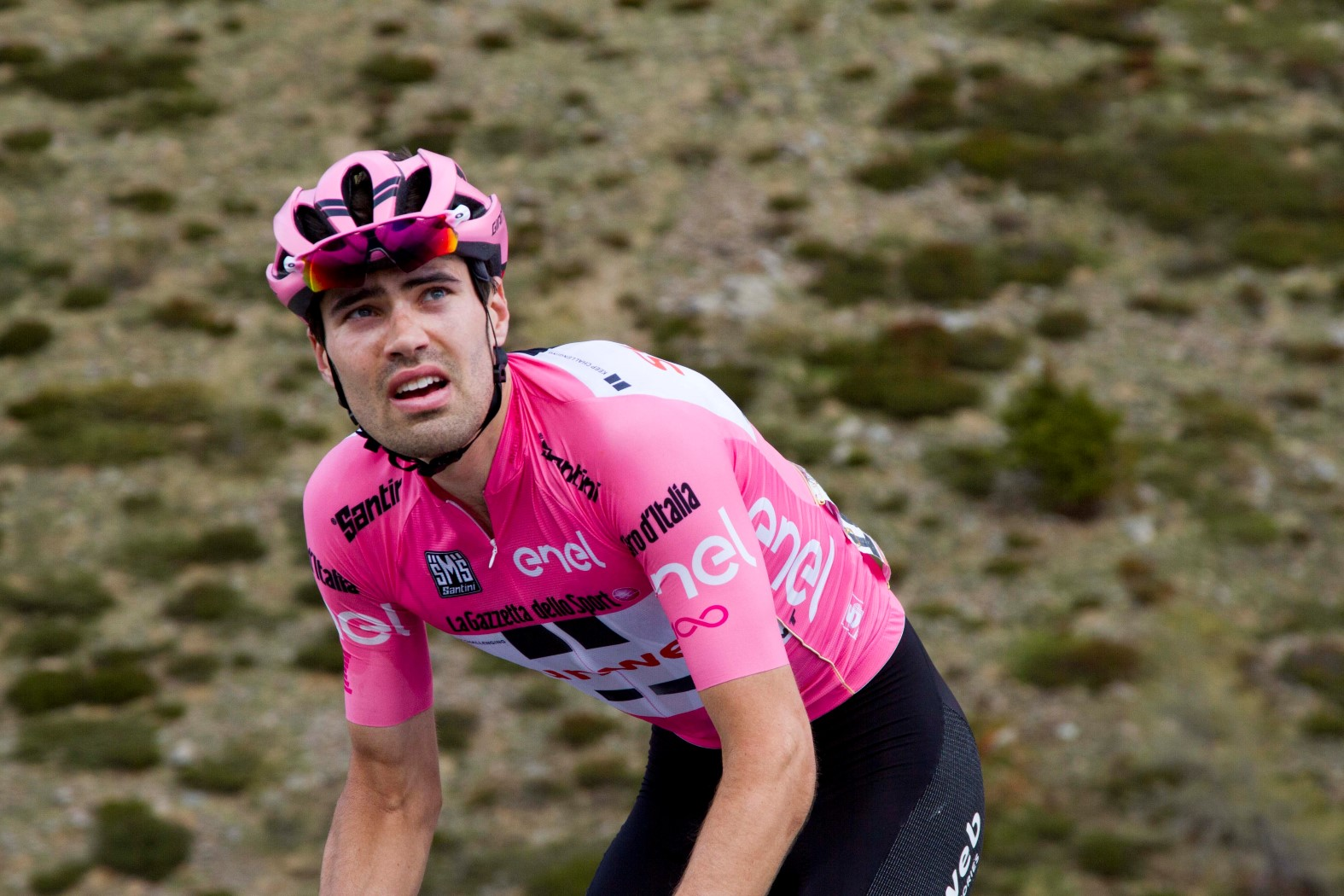
Tom Dumoulin

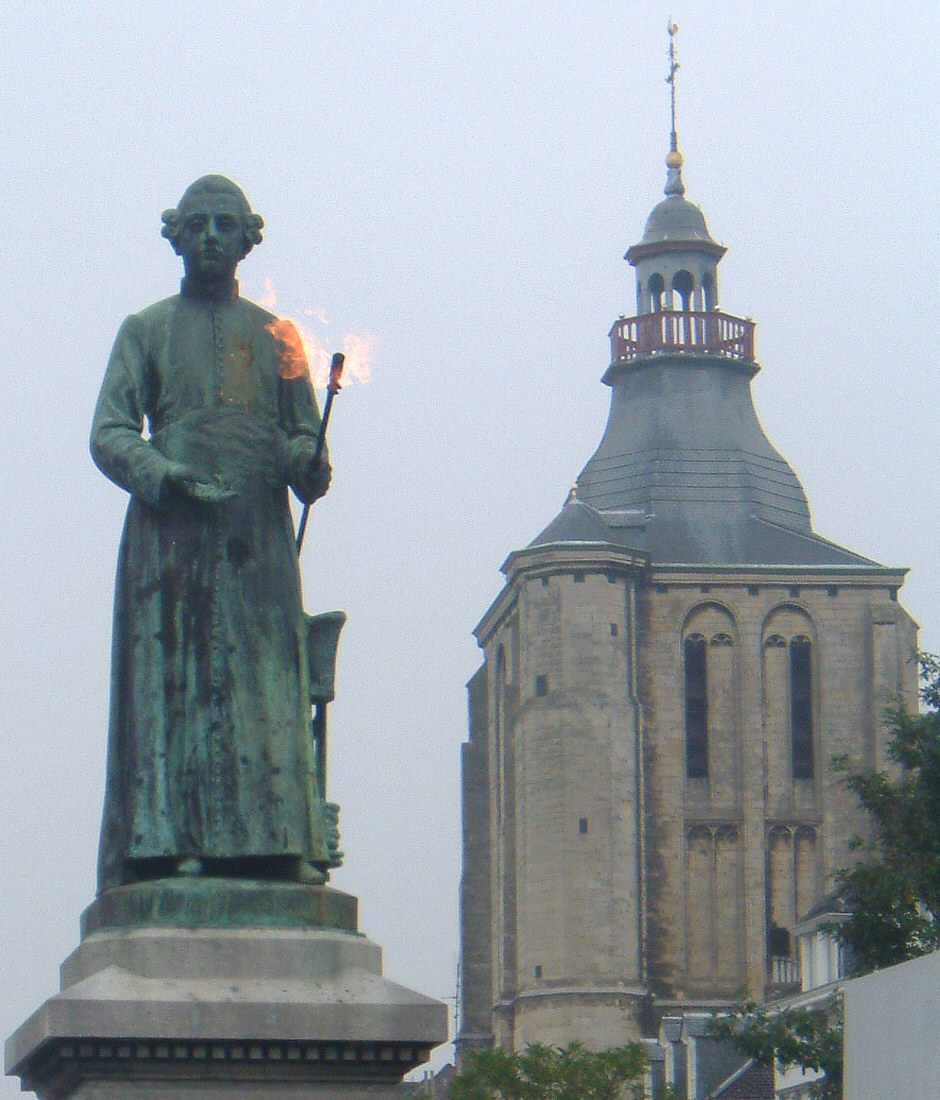
Jan Pieter Minckeleers

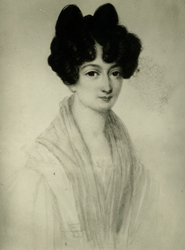
Henrietta d'Oultremont

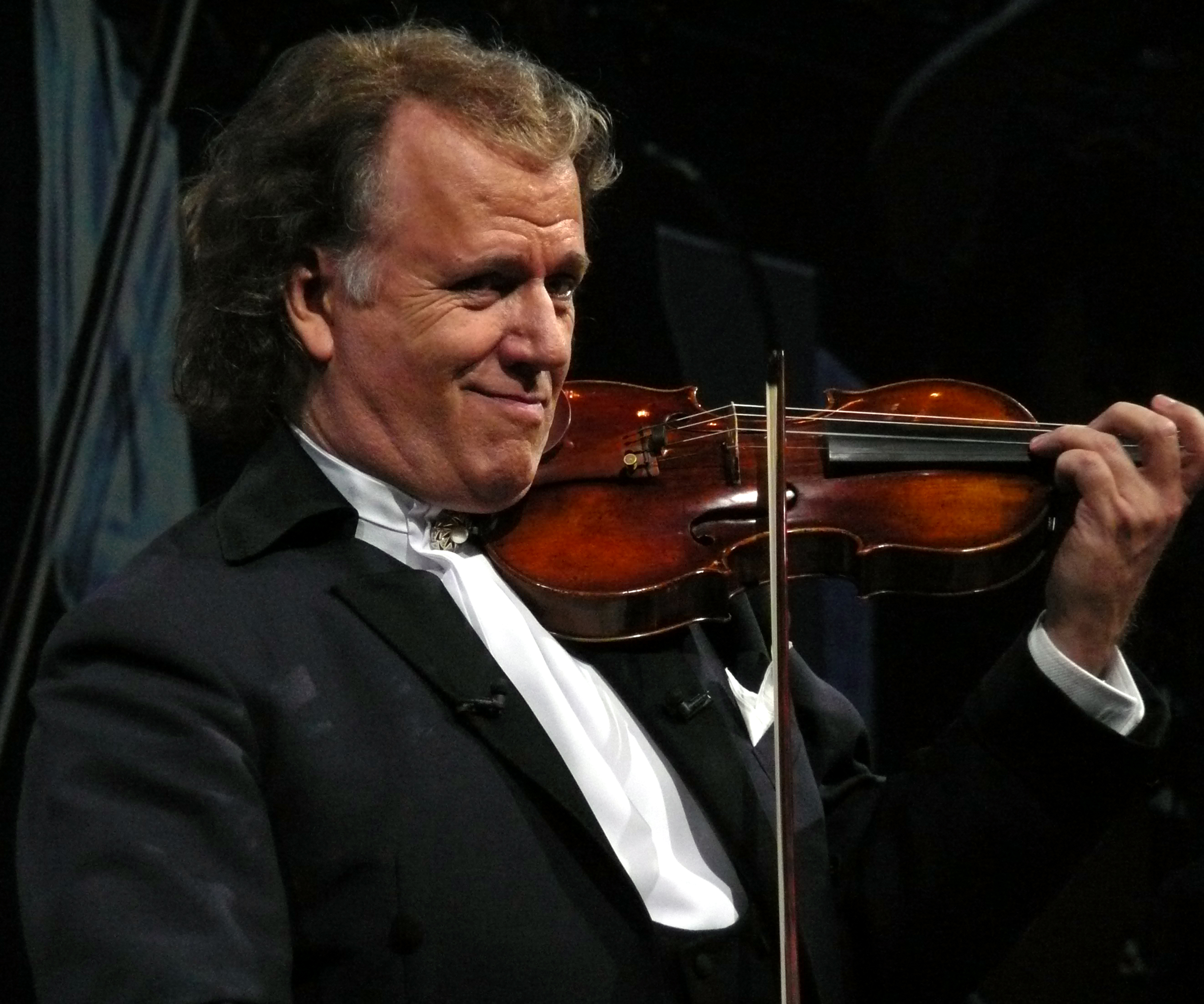
André Rieu

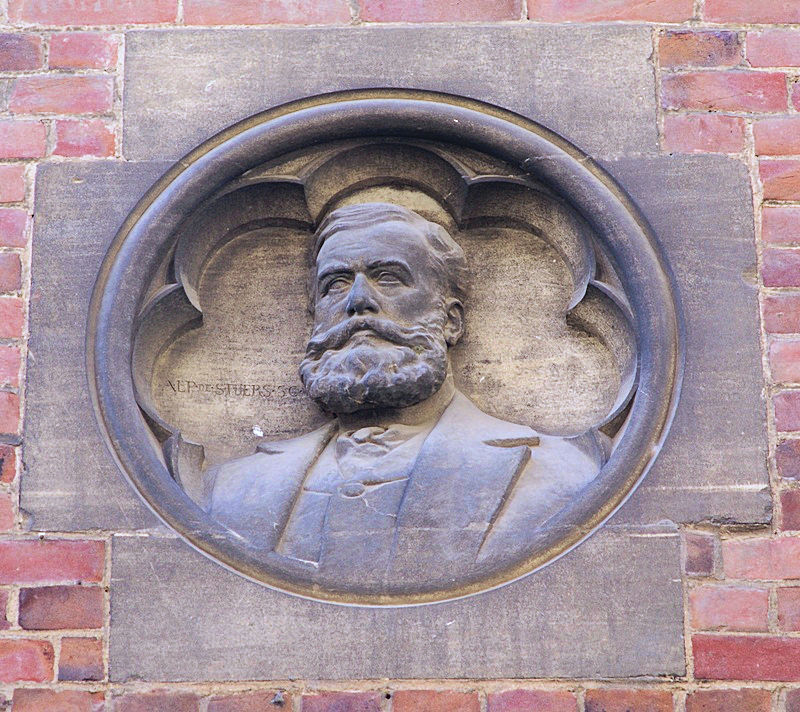
Victor de Stuers

=== Born in Maastricht ===
- Jean-Eugène-Charles Alberti (1777 – after 1843) – painter
- Henri Arends (1921–1993) – conductor
- Doris Baaten (born 1956) – voice actress
- Gerard Bergholtz (born 1939) – footballer
- Mieke de Boer (born 1980) – female darts player
- Alphons Boosten (1893–1951) – architect
- Theo Bovens (born 1959) – politician
- Joseph Bruyère (born 1948) – Belgian cyclist
- Jeu van Bun (1918–2002) – footballer
- Gerard Caris (1925–2025) – sculptor and artist
- Jean-Baptiste Coclers (1696–1772) – painter
- Louis Bernard Coclers (1740–1817) – painter
- Wilhelm René de l'Homme de Courbière (1733–1811) – Prussian field marshal
- Peter Debye (1884–1966) – Nobel Prize winning chemist
- Tom Dumoulin (born 1990) – cyclist, Giro d'Italia winner
- Huub Felix (1895–1967) – football player
- Robin Frijns (born 1991) – Racing Driver
- Hendrick Fromantiou (1633/4 – after 1693) – still life painter
- Joop Haex (1911–2002) – politician
- André Henri Constant van Hasselt (1806–1874) – French-writing poet
- Hubert Hermans (born 1937) – psychologist and creator of Dialogical Self Theory
- Pieter van den Hoogenband (born 1978) – swimmer and a triple Olympic champion
- Ben Hoogstede (1888–1962) – football player
- Pierre Kemp (1886–1967) – poet
- Sjeng Kerbusch (1947–1991) – behavior geneticist
- Mathieu Kessels (1784–1836) – sculptor
- Lambert of Maastricht (c. 636 – c. 705) – bishop, saint
- Marie-Louise Linssen-Vaessen (1928–1993) – freestyle swimmer
- Eric van der Luer (born 1965) – footballer, football manager
- Pierre Lyonnet (1708–1789) – naturalist, cryptographer, engraver
- Félix de Mérode (1791–1857) – politician, writer
- David de Meyne (1569–1620) – painter and cartographer
- Andreas Victor Michiels (1797–1849) – military and administrative officer in the Dutch East Indies
- Jan Pieter Minckeleers (1748–1824) – scientist and inventor of coal gas lighting
- Bram Moszkowicz (born 1960) – ex-barrister
- Benny Neyman (1951–2008) – singer of popular songs
- Tom Nijssen (born 1964) – tennis player
- Jacques Ogg (born 1948) – harpsichordist
- Henrietta d'Oultremont (1792–1864) – second wife of William I of the Netherlands
- Jan Peumans (born 1951) – Belgian politician
- Guido Pieters (born 1948) – film director
- Dick Raaymakers (1930–2013) – composer, theater maker
- Prince Rajcomar (born 1985) – football player
- Louis Regout (1861–1915) – politician
- André Rieu (born 1949) – violinist, conductor and composer
- Fred Rompelberg (born 1945) – cyclist, former world record holder
- Louis Rutten (1884–1946) – geologist
- Henri Sarolea (1844–1900) – railway entrepreneur and contractor
- Mathieu Segers (1976-2023), historian
- Bryan Smeets (born 1992) – football player
- Hubert Soudant (born 1946) – conductor
- Victor de Stuers (1843–1916) – politician, monument conservationist
- Jac. P. Thijsse (1865–1945) – botanist, conservationist
- Germaine Thyssens-Valentin (1902–1987) – pianist
- Ad van Tiggelen (born 1958) – fantasy writer Adrian Stone
- Frans Timmermans (born 1961) – politician
- Johann Friedrich August Tischbein (1750–1812) – portrait painter
- Maxime Verhagen (born 1956) – politician
- Carel de Vogelaer (1653–1695) – painter
- Hubert Vos (1855–1935) – painter
- Ad Wijnands (born 1959) – cyclist, Tour de France stage winner
- Jeroen Willems (1962–2012) – actor, singer
- Henri Winkelman (1876–1952) – general
- Danny Wintjens (born 1983) – football goalkeeper
- Boudewijn Zenden (born 1976) – football player
- Kim Zwarts (born 1955) – photographer

=== Residing in Maastricht ===
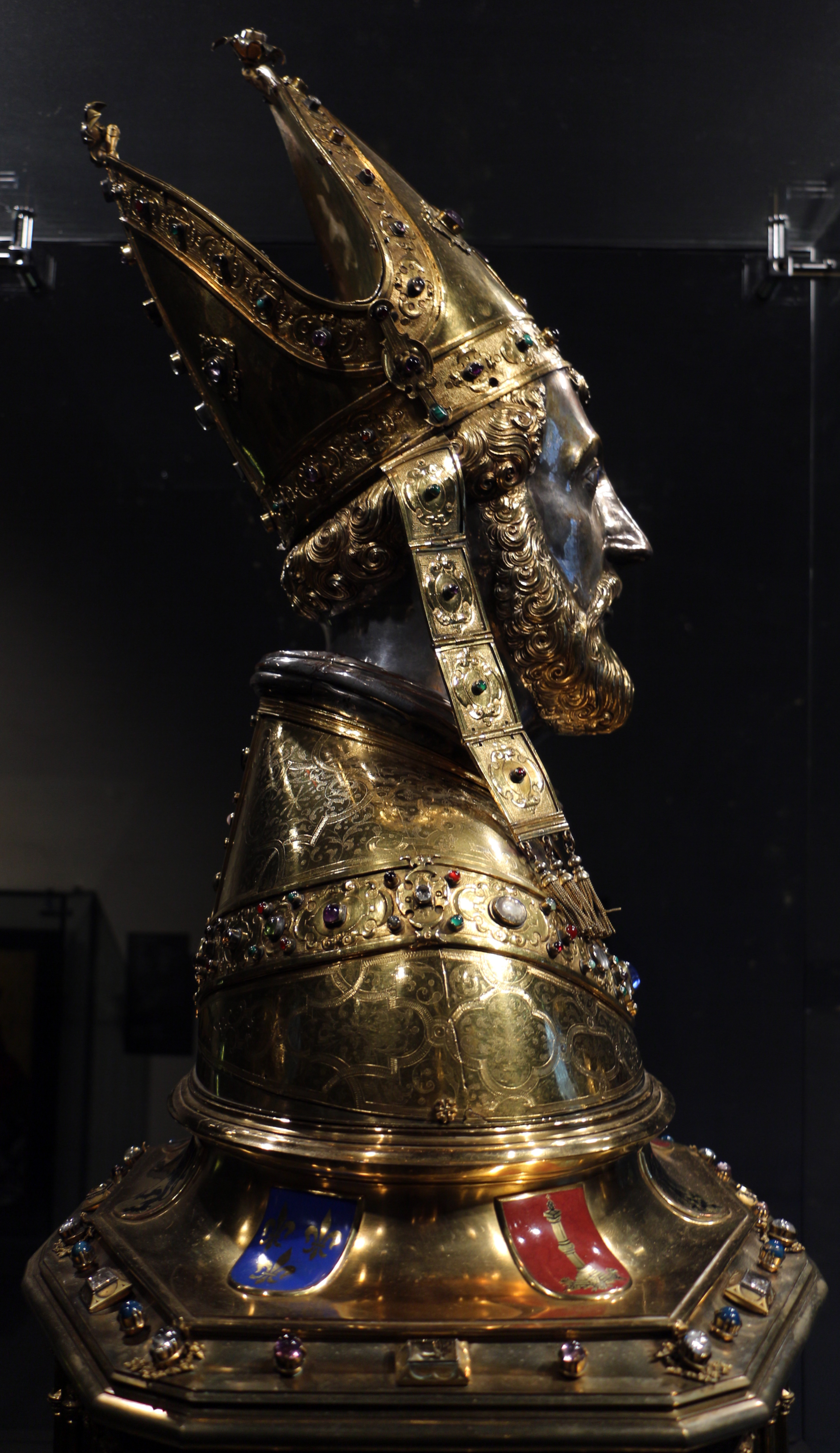
Saint Servatius

- Jo Bonfrère (born 1946) – football player
- Willy Brokamp (born 1946) – football player
- Jeroen Brouwers (1940–2022) – writer, journalist
- Gondulph of Maastricht (c.524–c.607) – bishop, saint
- Theo Hiddema (born 1944) – lawyer
- Willem Hofhuizen (1915–1986) – painter
- Theodoor van Loon (c.1581–1649) – painter
- Monulph of Maastricht (6th century) – bishop, saint
- Max Moszkowicz (1926–2022) – lawyer
- Servatius of Maastricht (4th century–384?) – bishop, saint
- Jan van Steffeswert (15th/16th century) – sculptor, wood carver
- Aert van Tricht (15th/16th century) – metal caster
- Henric van Veldeke (12th century) – poet, hagiographer

== Local anthem ==
In 2002 the municipal government officially adopted a local anthem (Limburgish (Maastrichtian variant): Mestreechs Volksleed, Dutch: Maastrichts Volkslied) composed of lyrics in Maastrichtian, written by Alfons Olterdissen. The theme was originally composed by his brother, Guus Olterdissen, though the theme is similar to the theme "Pe al nostru steag e scris Unire" of the Romanian composer Ciprian Porumbescu (1853–1883). It is unknown if the Olterdissen brothers were aware of the Romanian piece.

Maastrichtian municipal anthem (Mestreechs Volksleed) (adopted 2002, written 1910)

1
Hoera! Vivat! Mestreech!!!
Jao diech höbs us aon 't hart gelege,
Mestreech, door alle ieuwe heer.
Veer bleve diech altied genege
En deilde dreufheid en plezeer.
Veer huurde nao dien aw histories
Te peerd op grampeer ziene sjoet.
Ues ouge blónke bij dien glories
Of perelde bij diene noet.

2
En dee vaan diech 't sjoens wèlt prijze,
In taol, die al wie zinge klink,
Dat dee op nui Mestreechter wijze
Zien aajd Mestreech mèt us bezingk.
Me zong vaan diech ten alle tije,
Eus mojers zonge bij de weeg,
En voolte veer us rech tevreie
Daan zong ze e leedsje vaan Mestreech.

3
Doe, blom vaan Nederlands landouwe,
Gegreujd op 't graaf vaan Sintervaos,
Bis weerdig dobbel te besjouwe,
Gespiegeld in de blanke Maos.
'n Staar, De witste oet de klaore,
Besjijnt diech mèt häör straole zach
En, um diech zuver te bewaore,
'nen Ingel hèlt bij diech de wach.

4
Wie dèks woorste neet priesgegeve,
Mèh heels dien kroen toch opgeriech
En ongeknak bis te gebleve,
Door euze band vaan trouw aon diech.
Daorum de hand us tòwgestoke,
't Oug geriech op 't stareleech;
En weur dat oug daan ins gebroke,
Daan beidt veur us het aajd Mestreech.

== Gallery ==
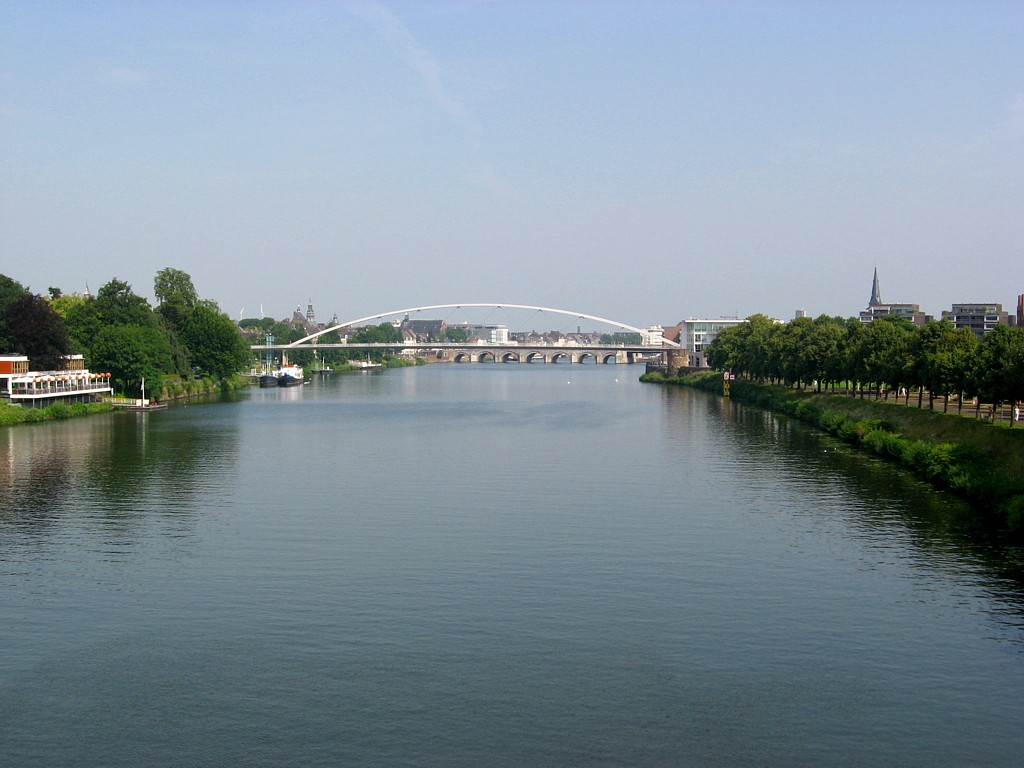
The Meuse

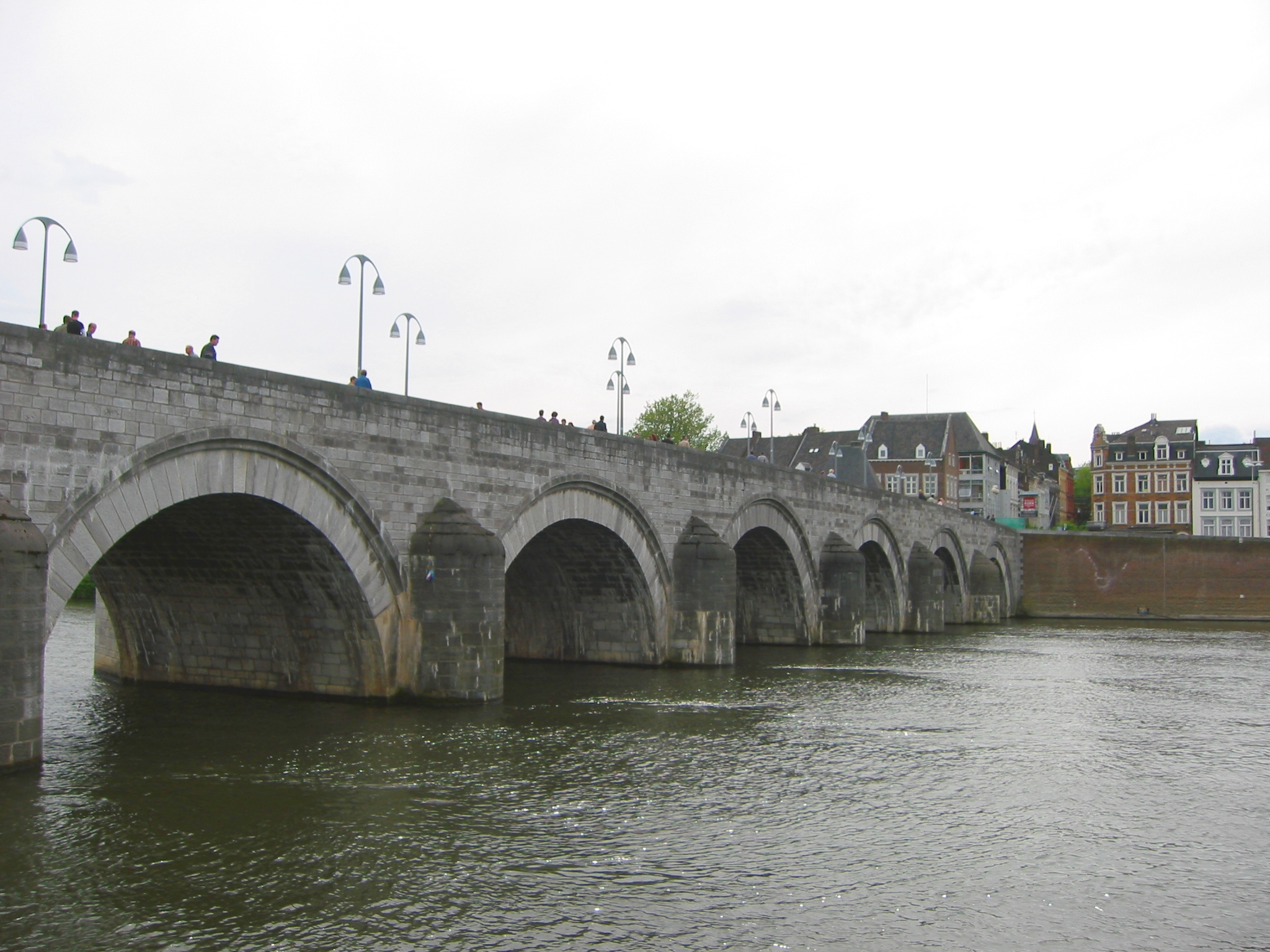
Saint Servatius Bridge

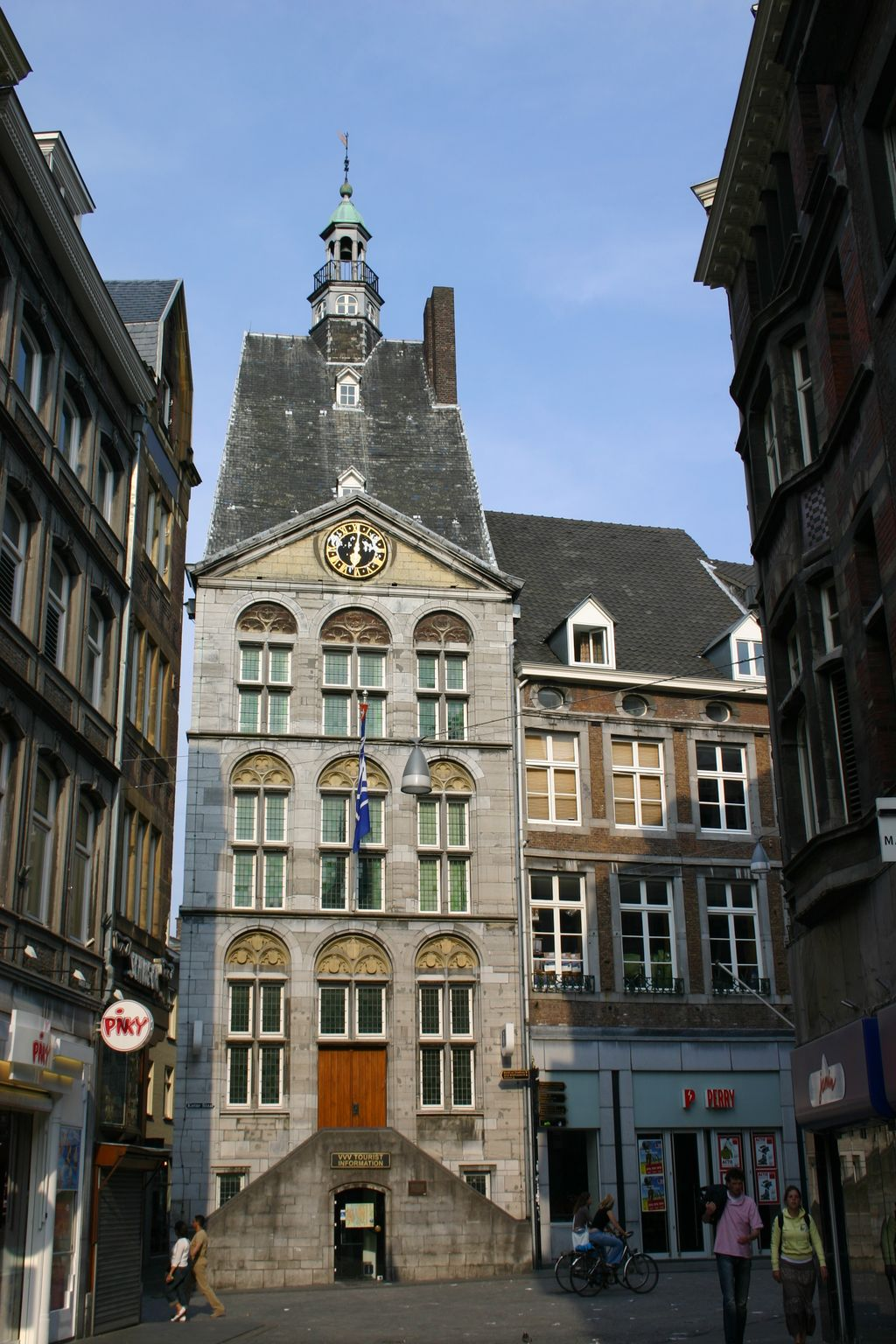
Dinghuis

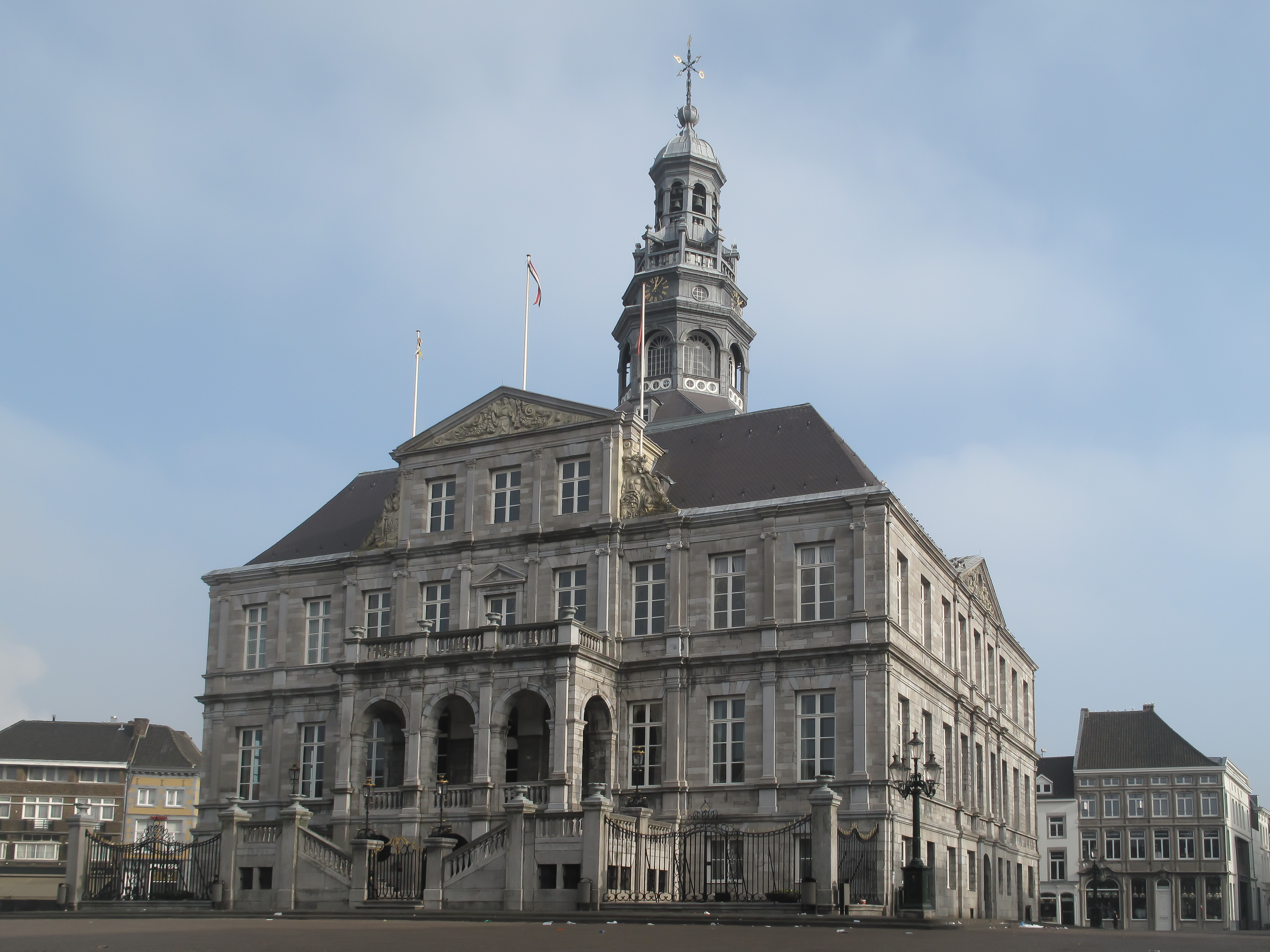
Townhall

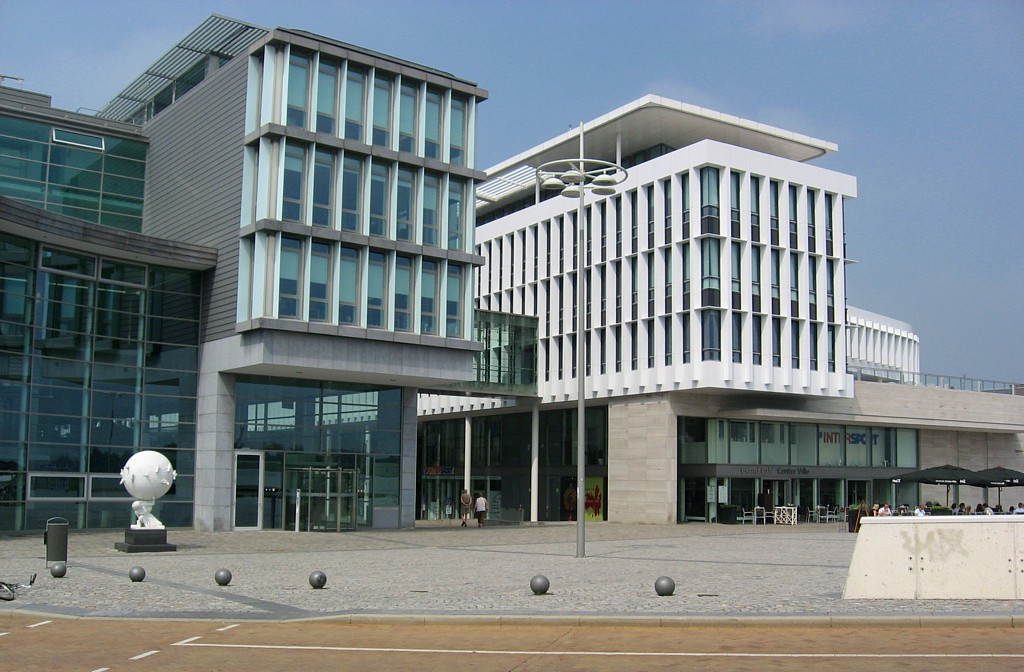
Mosae Forum

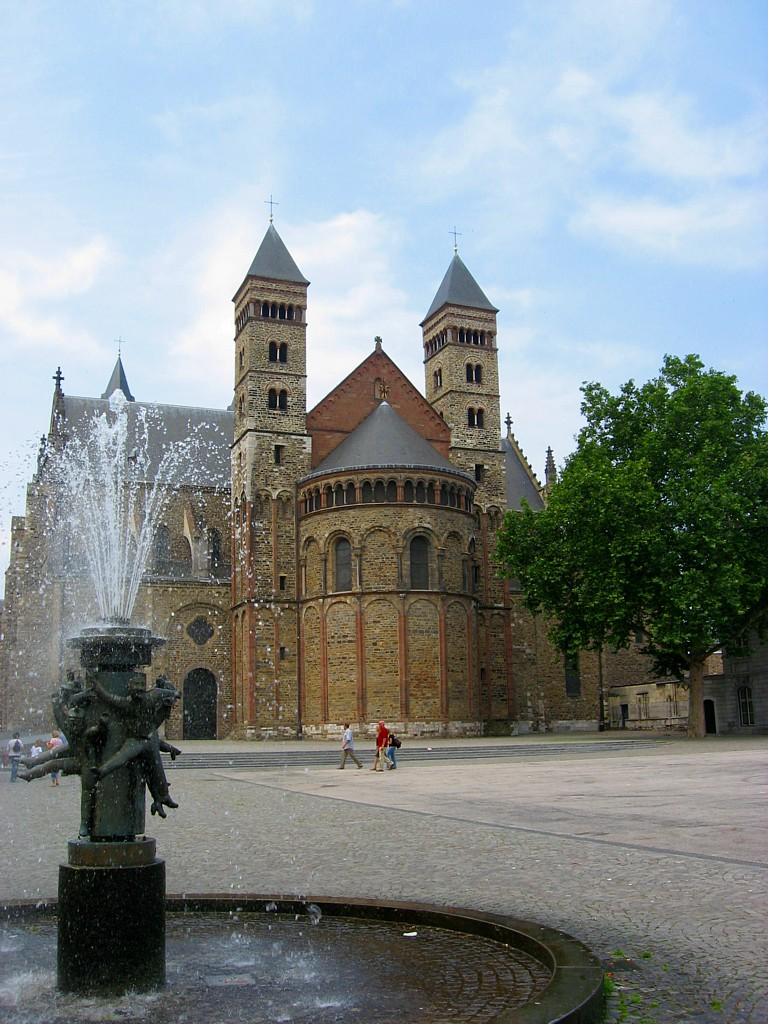
Saint Servatius Basilica

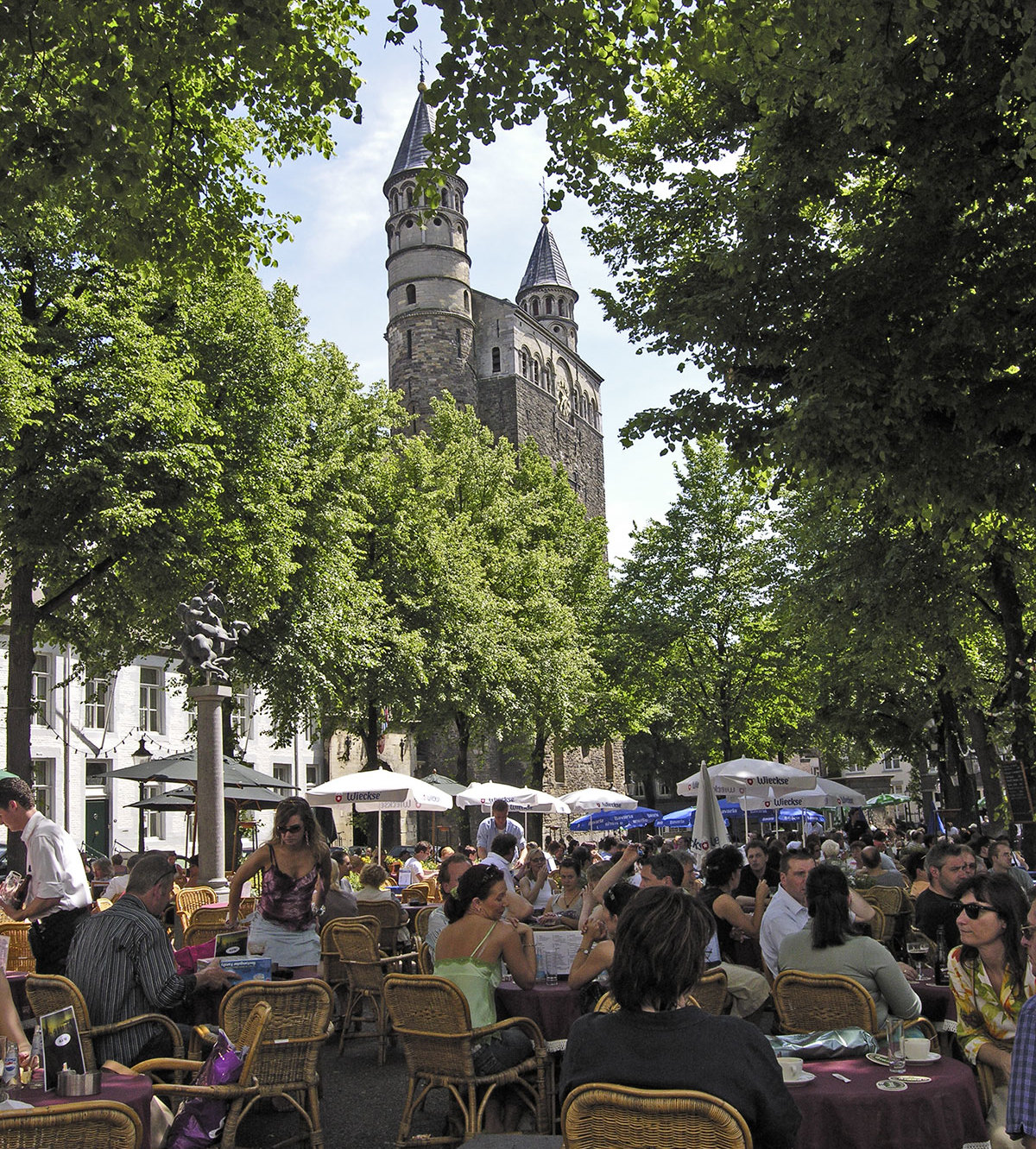
Onze-Lieve-Vrouweplein

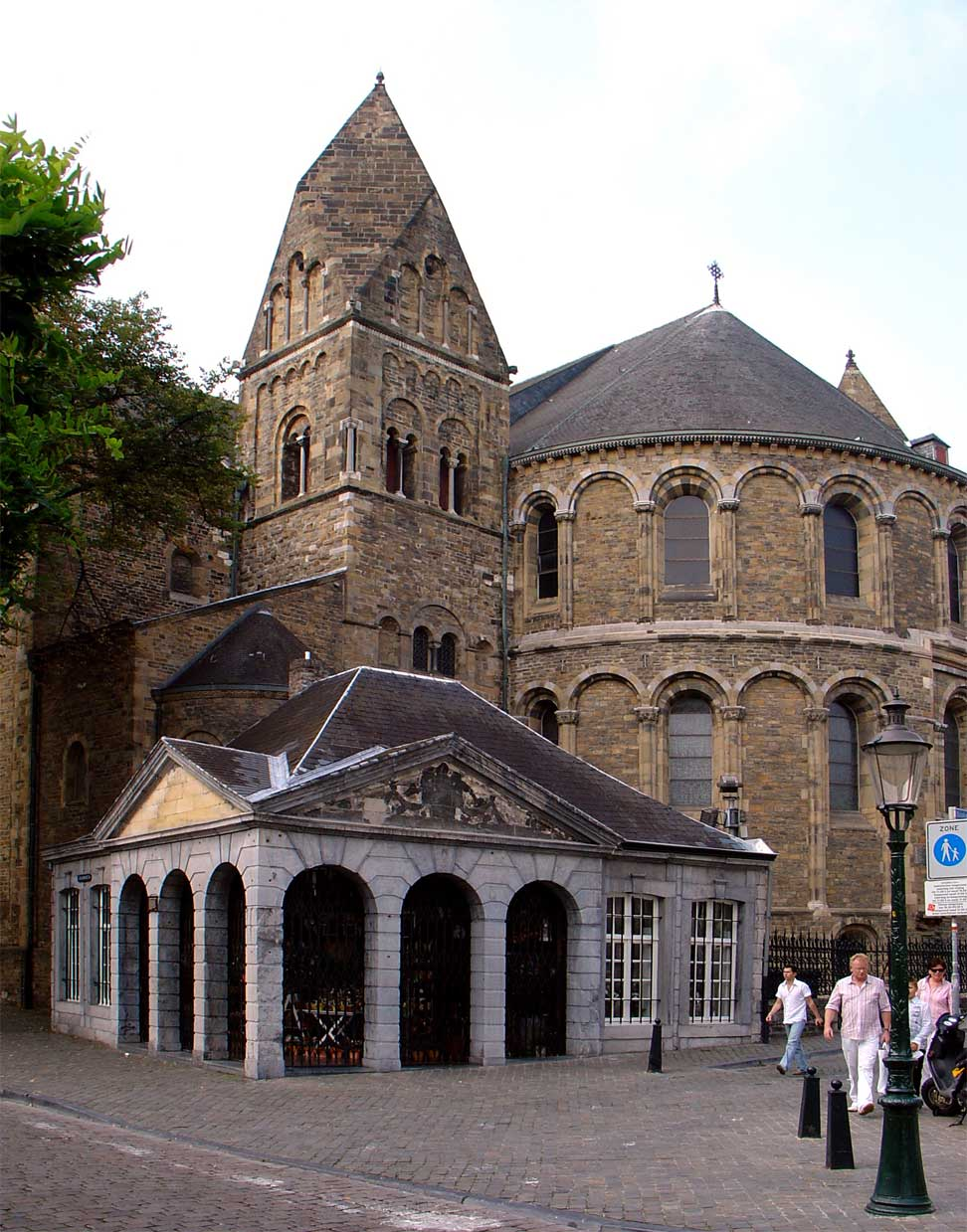
Basilica of Our Lady

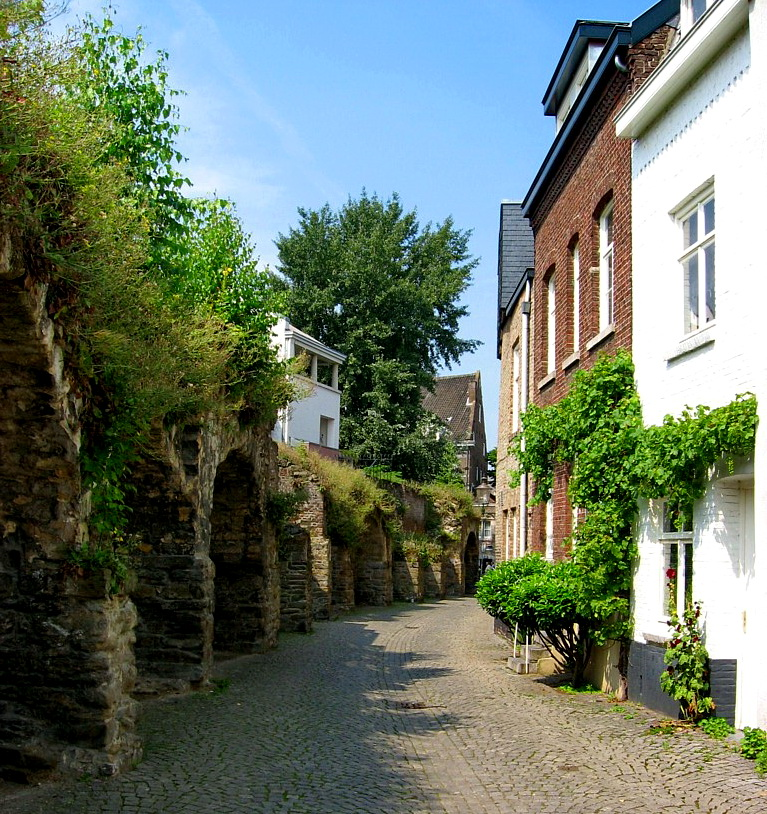
Lang Grachtje

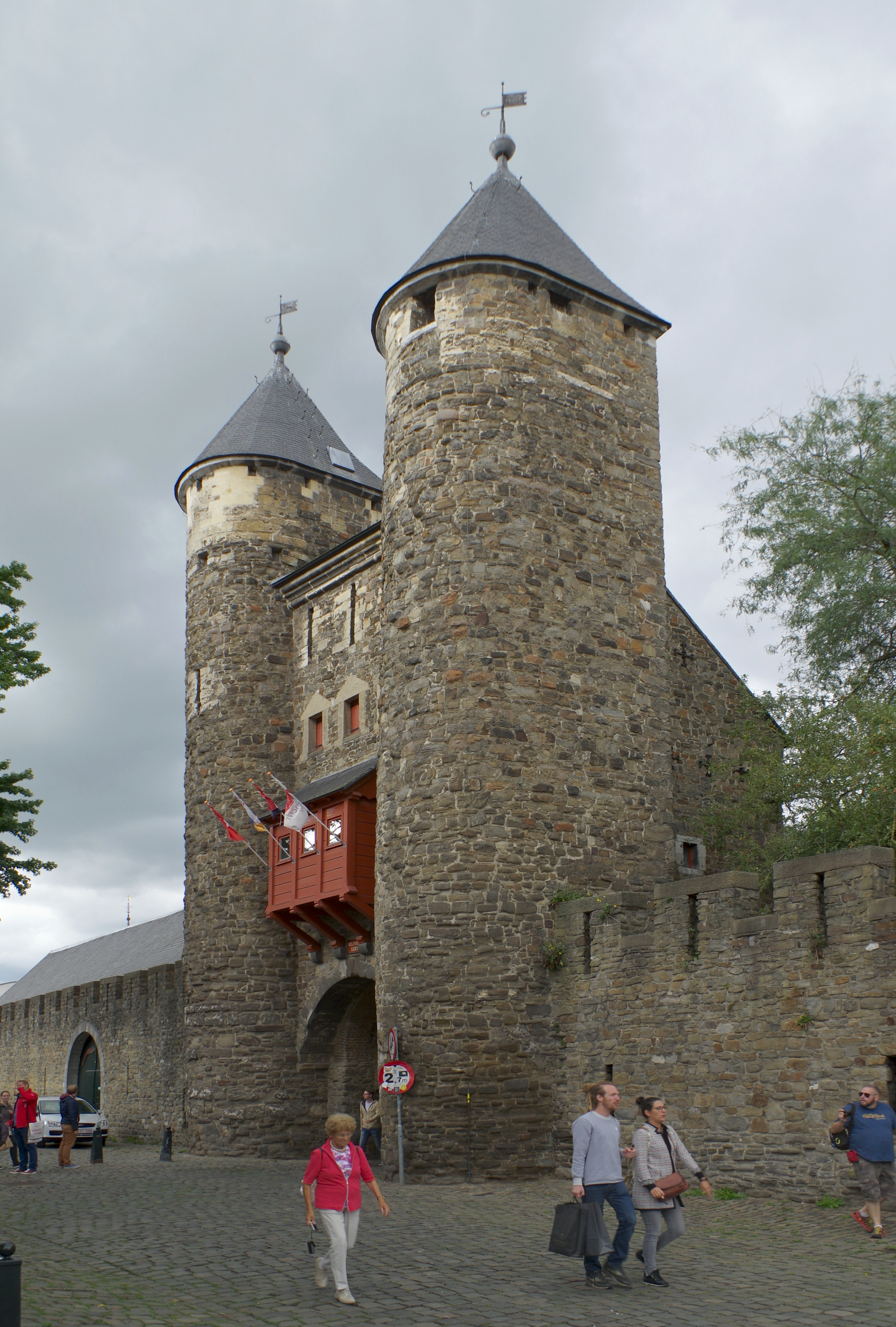
Helpoort ("Hell's Gate")

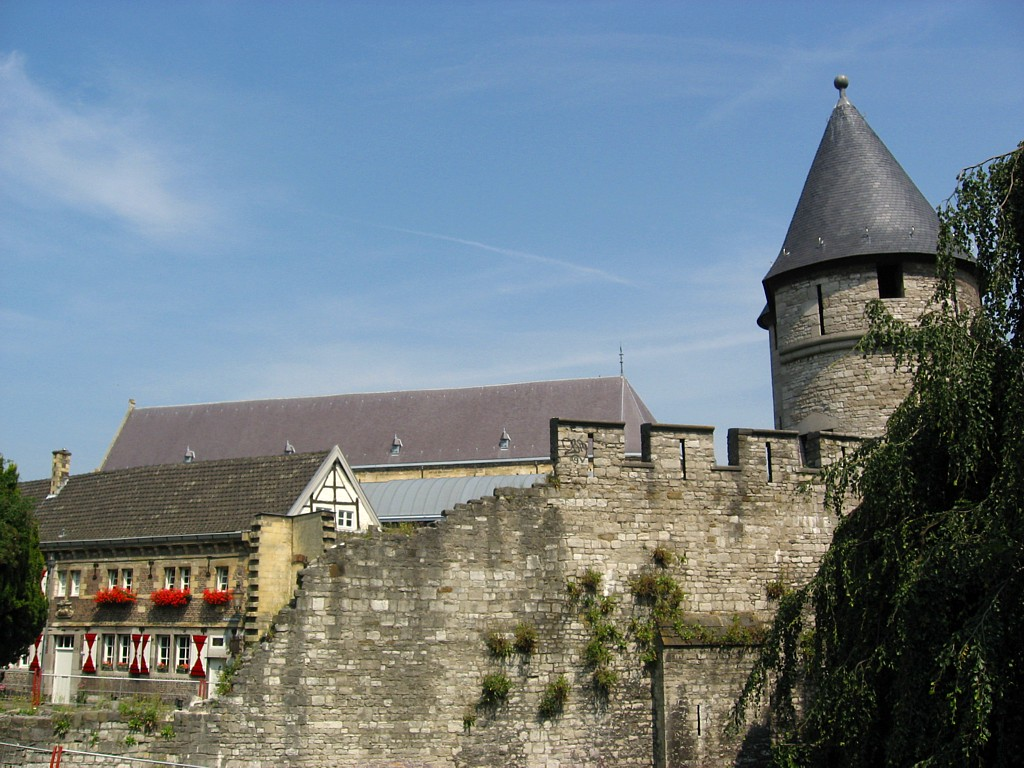
Pater Vink Tower

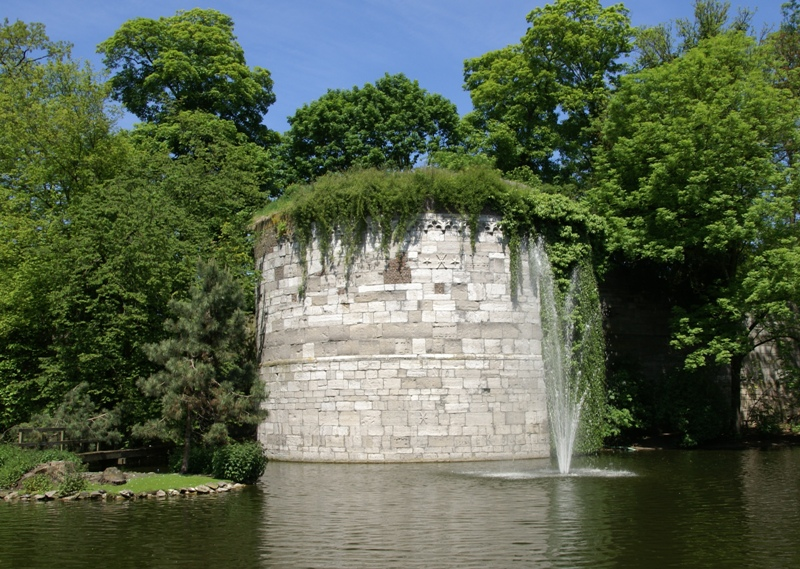
Bastion Haet ende Nijt

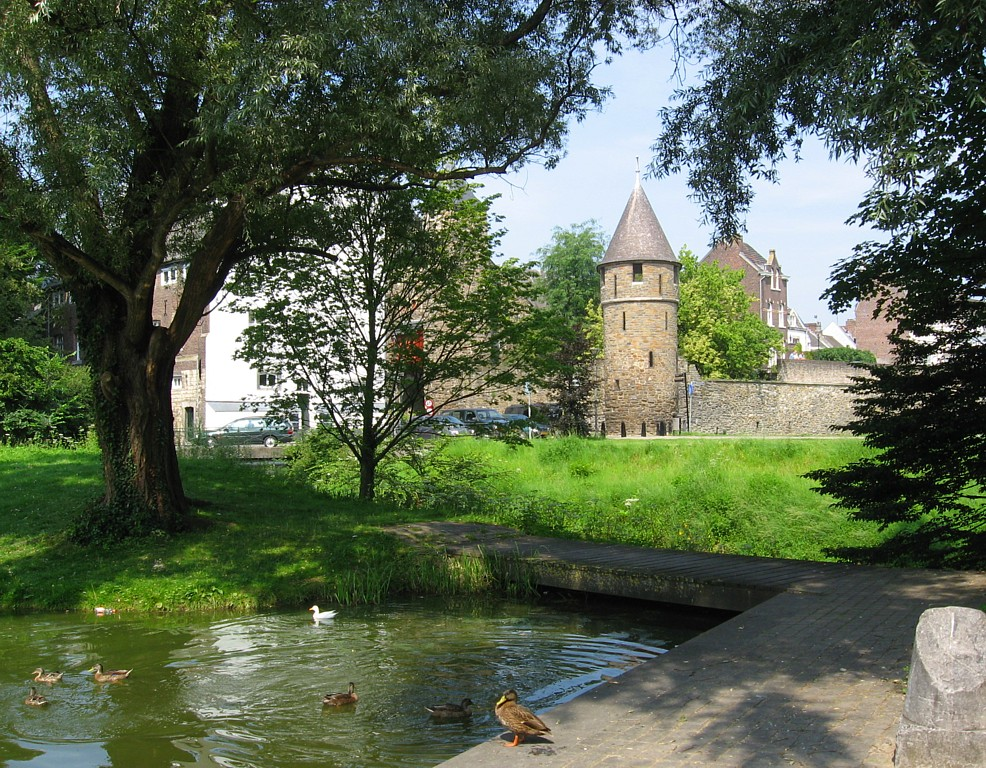
Stadspark

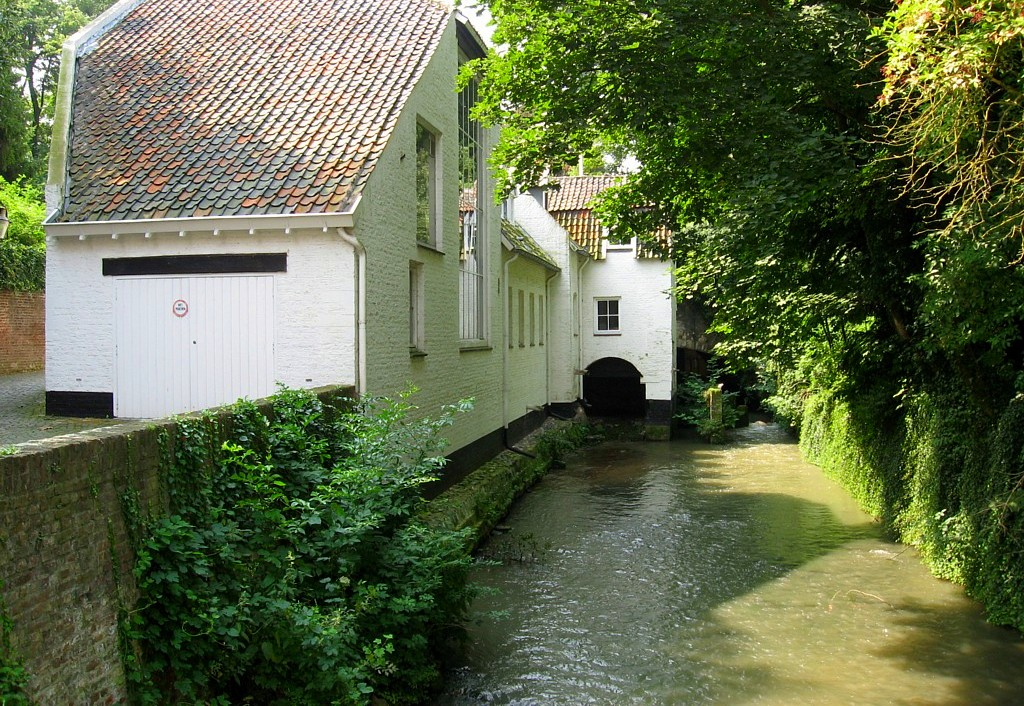
Jeker river

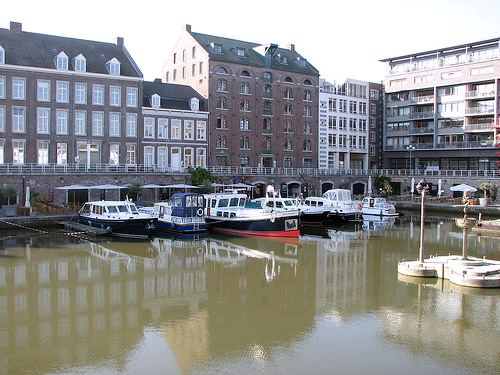
Bassin harbour

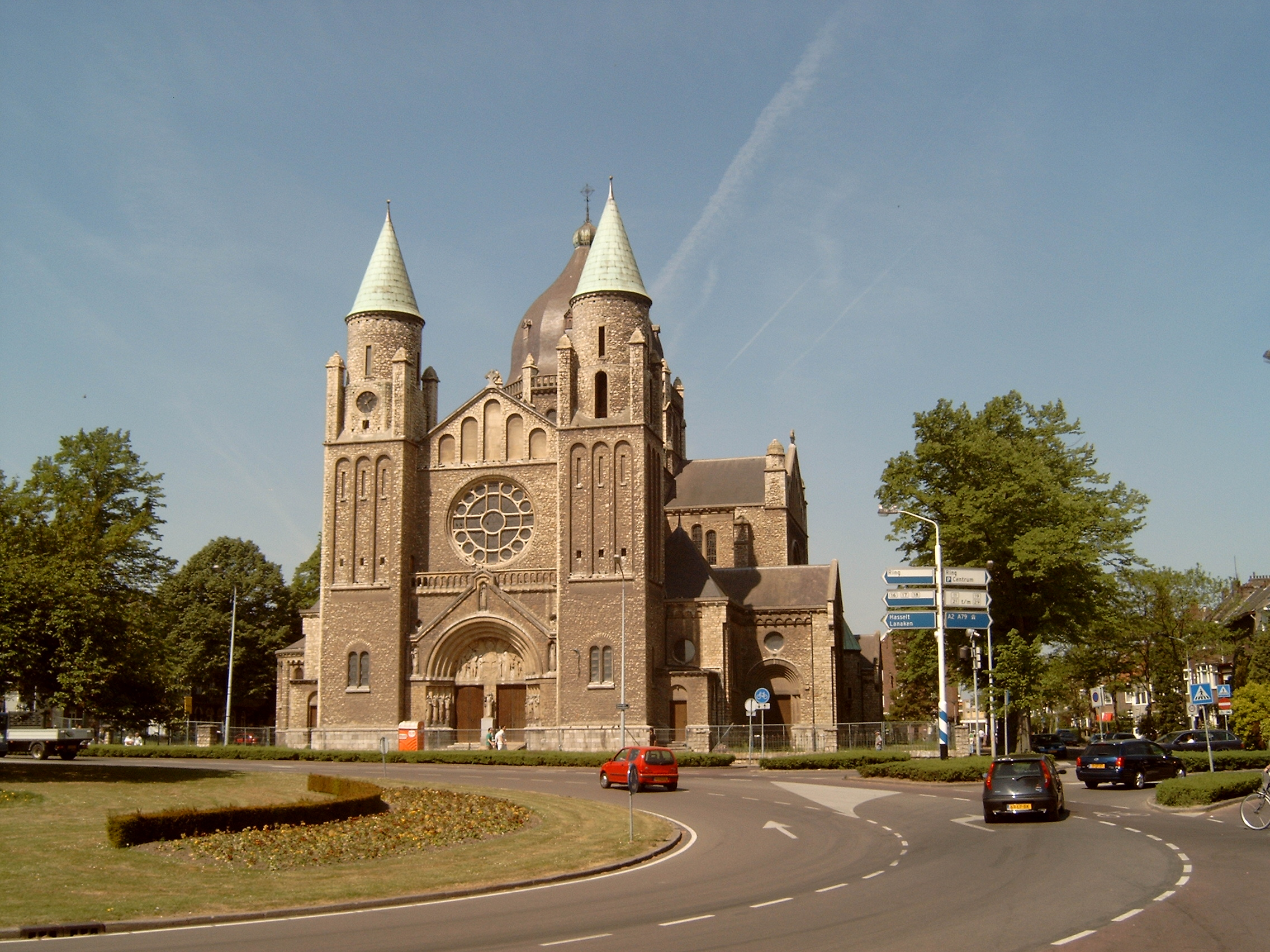
Saint Lambert Church

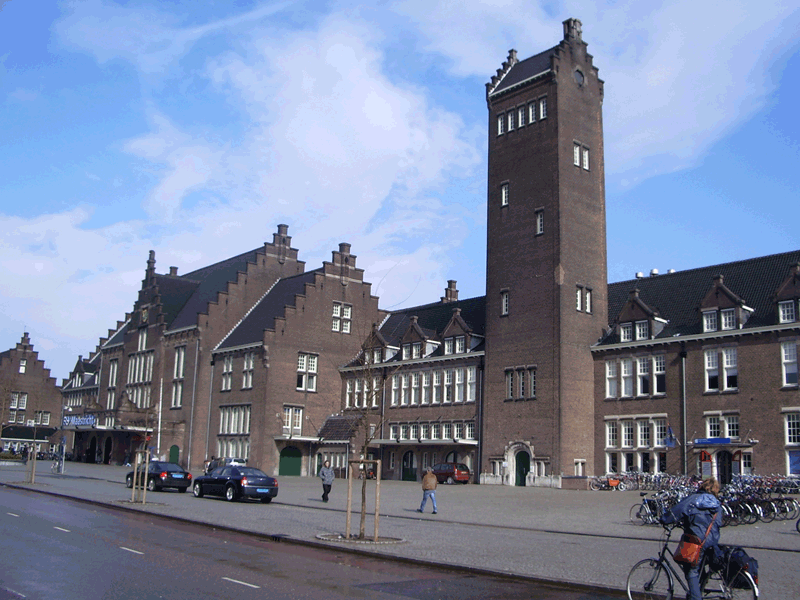
Train station, Wyck

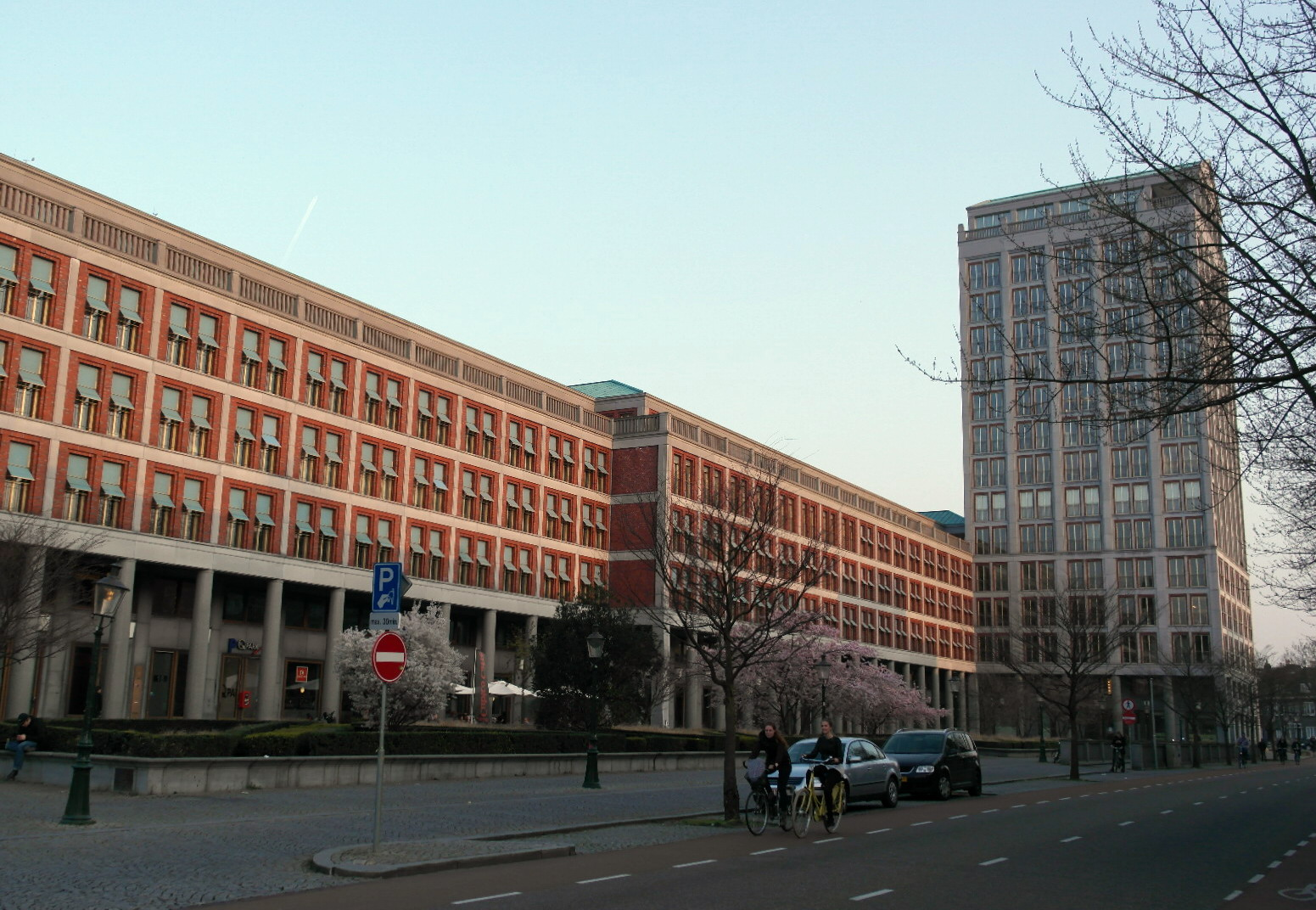
Stationsplein, Wyck

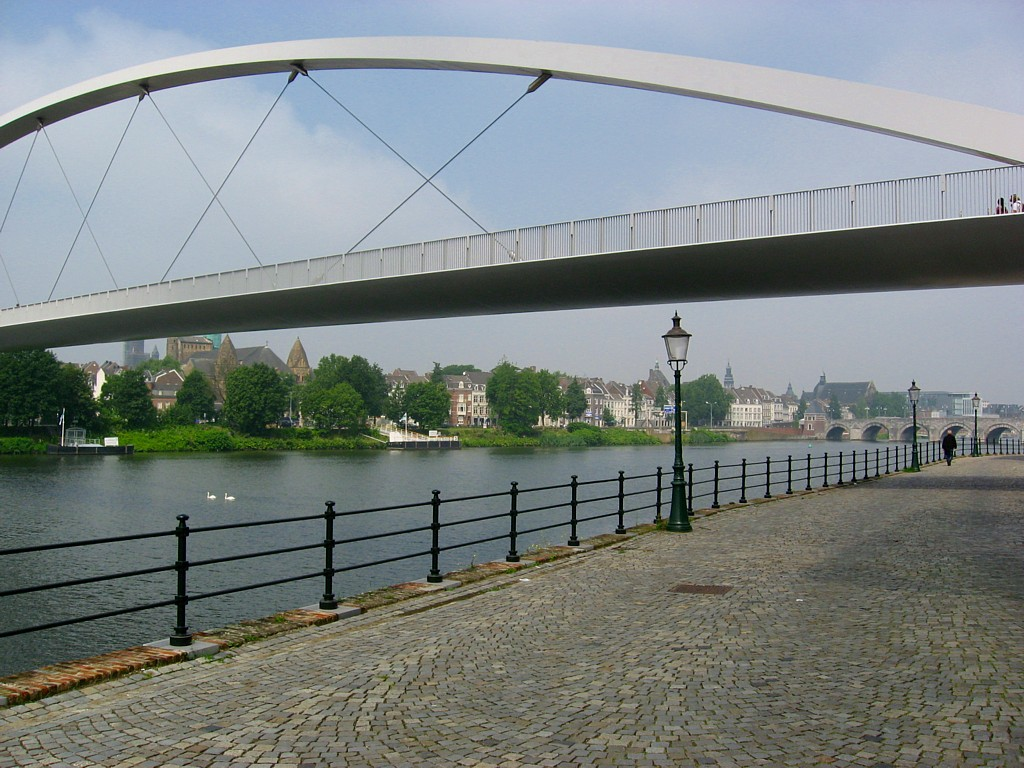
Hoeg Brögk

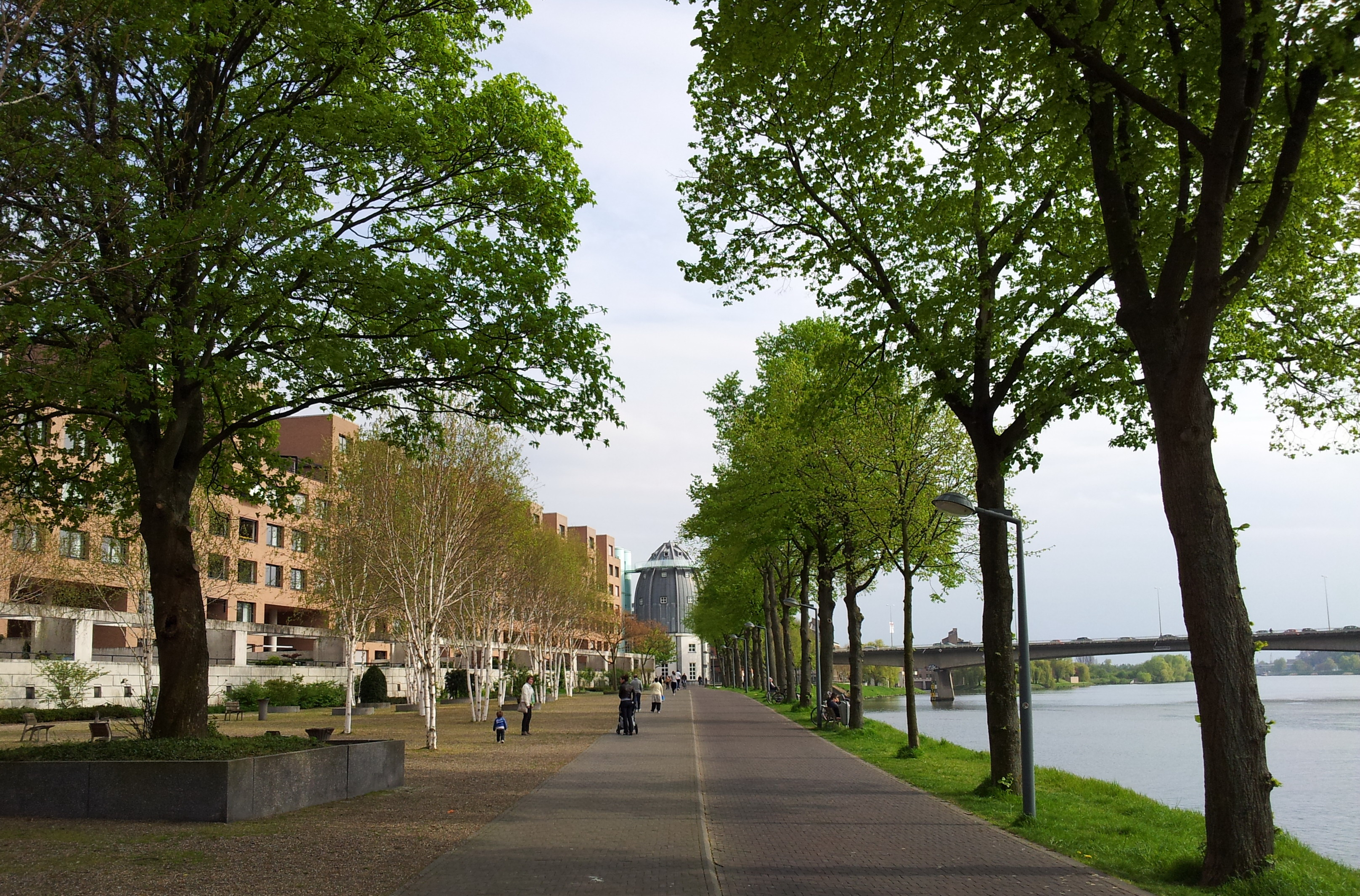
Charles Eyckpark, Céramique

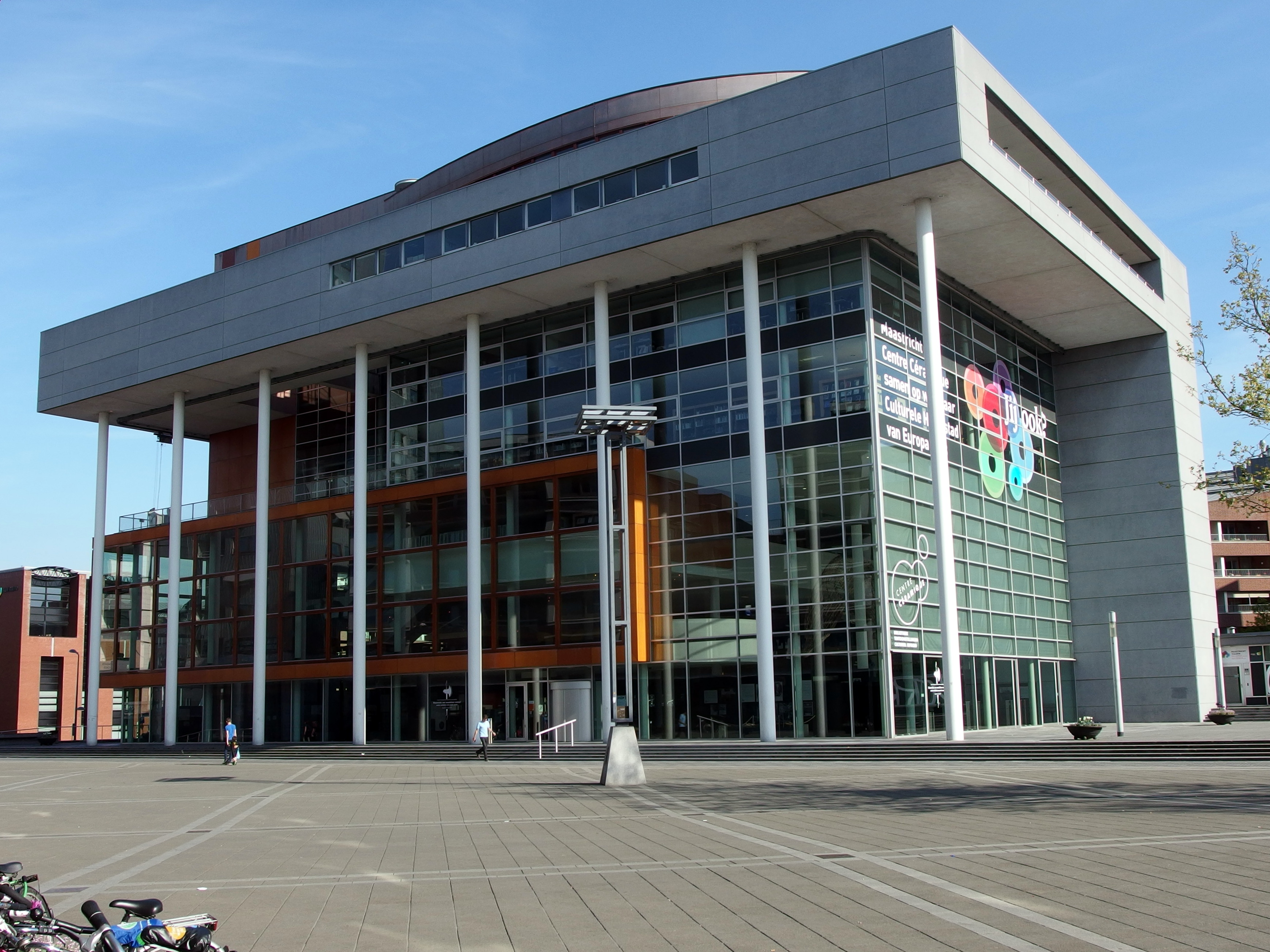
Public library, Céramique

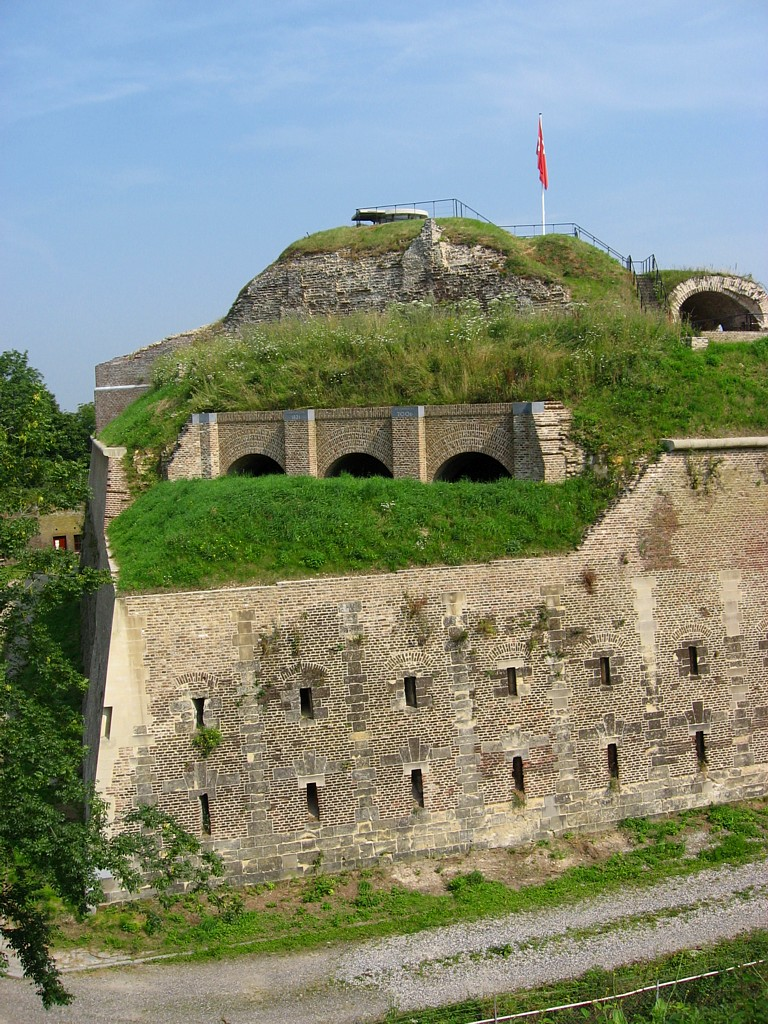
Fortress Sint Pieter

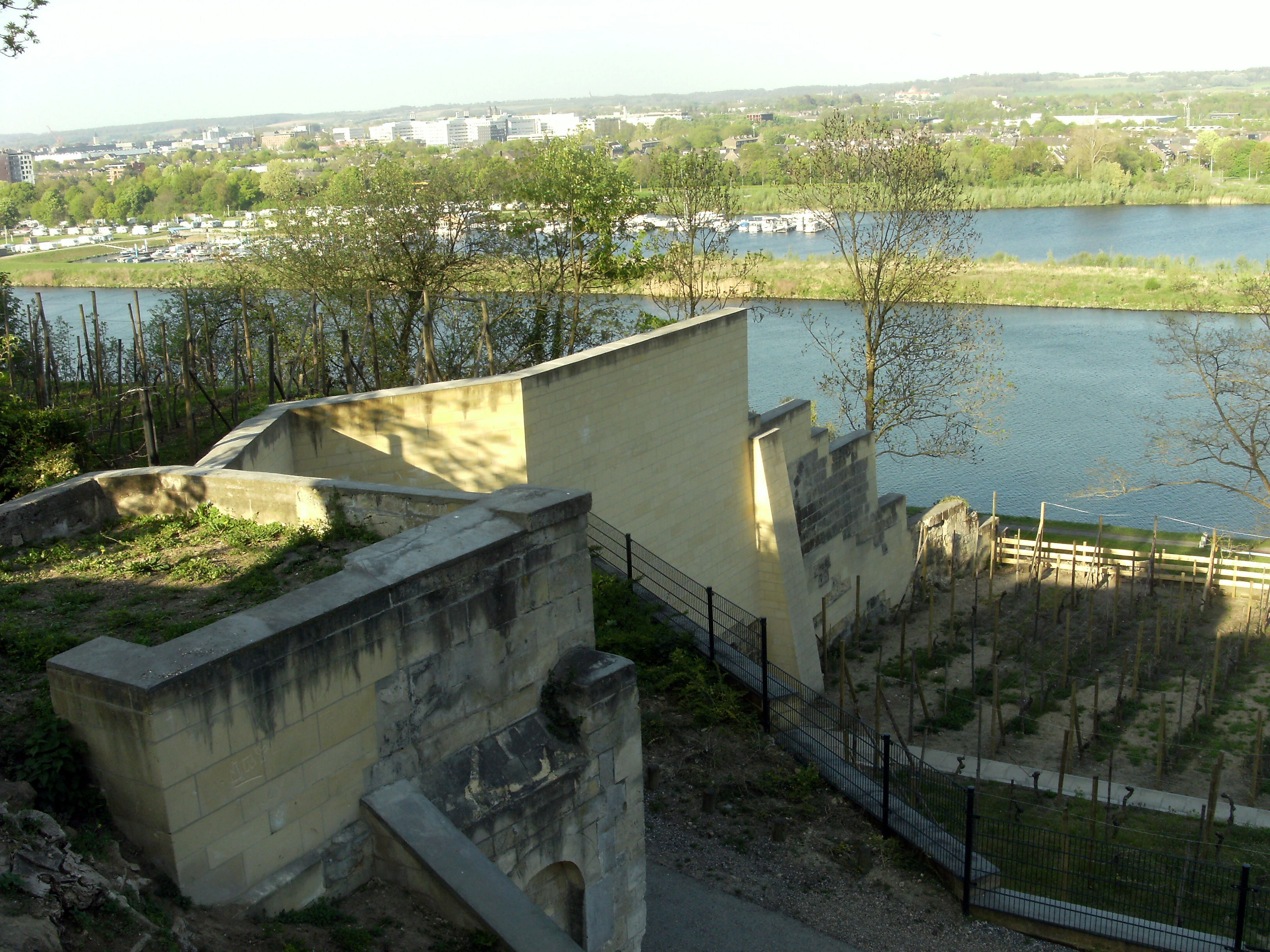
View from Slavante

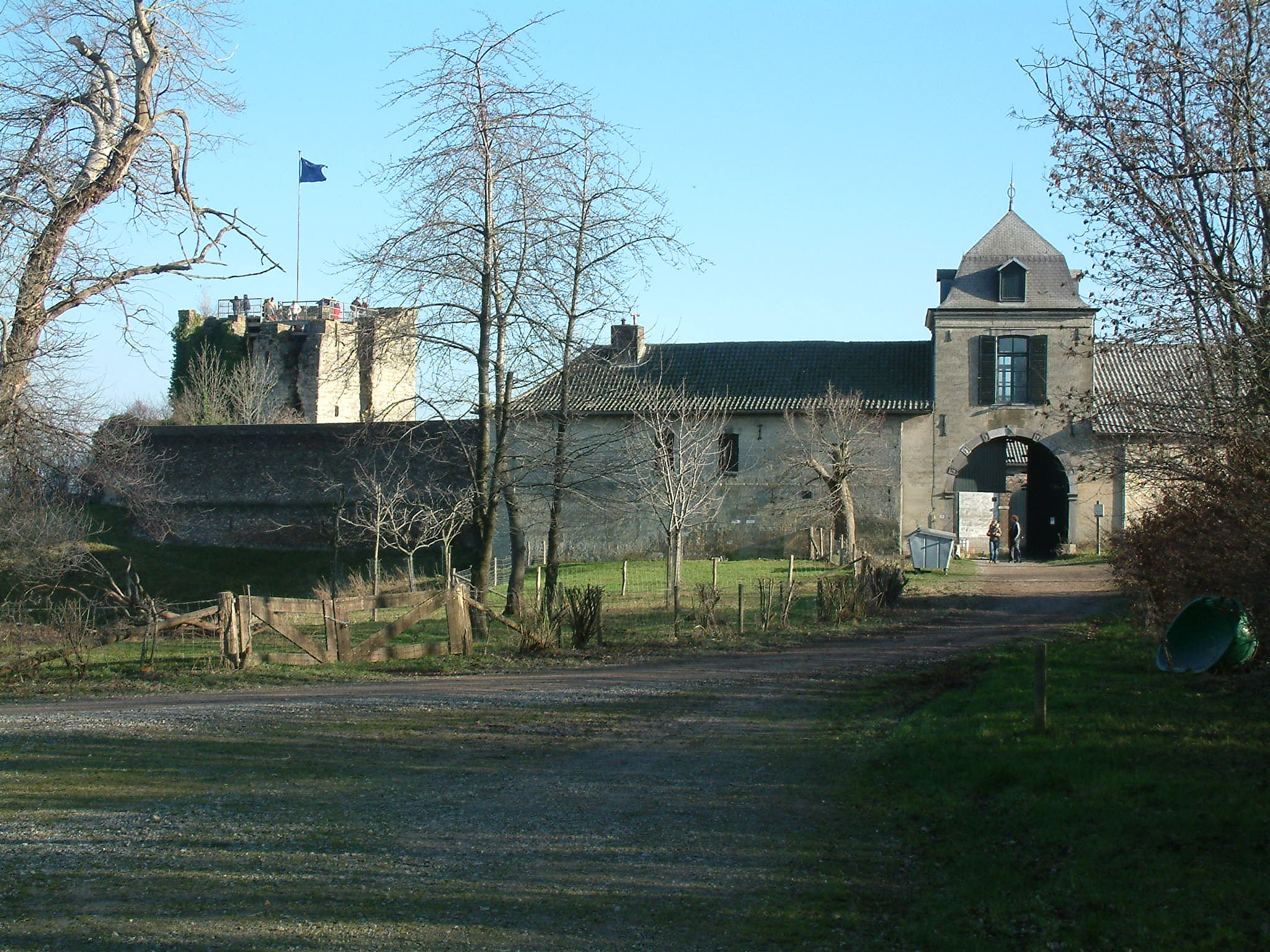
Castle ruin Lichtenberg

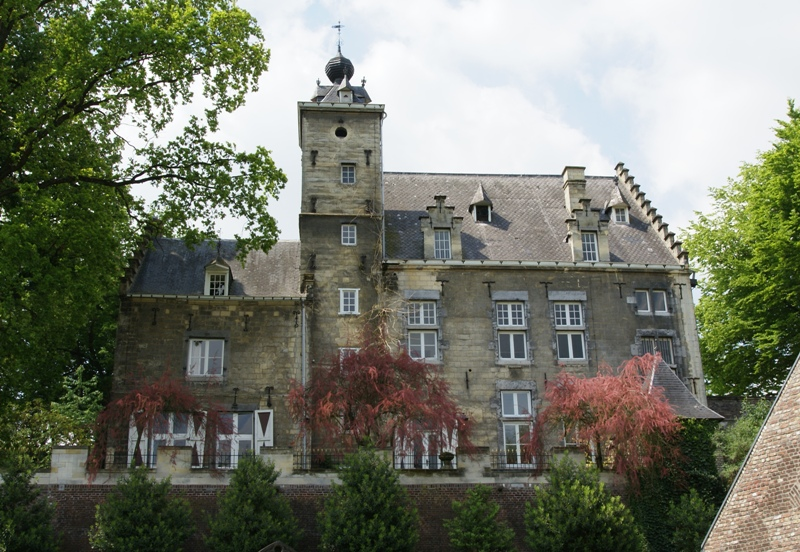
Huis de Torentjes

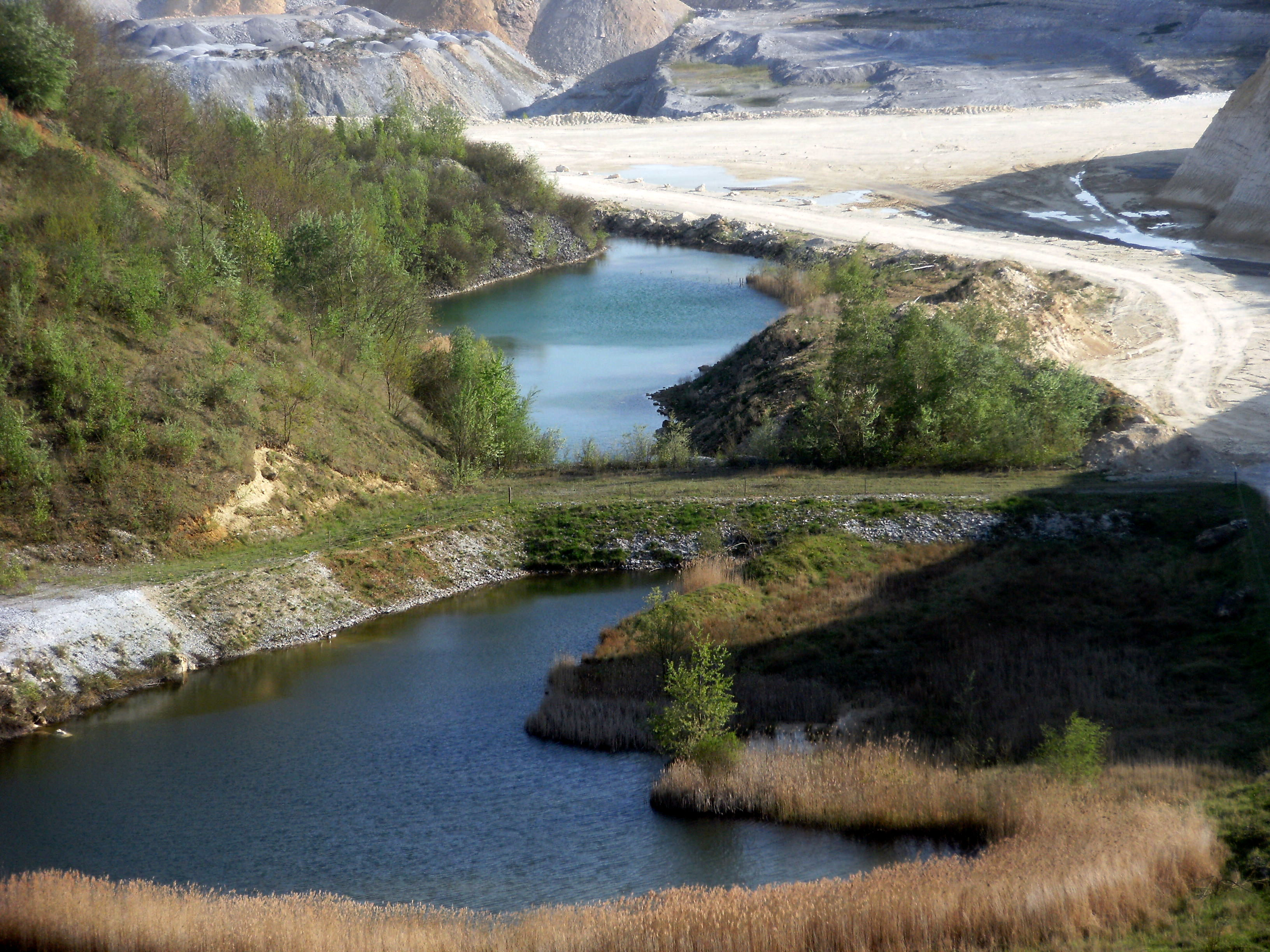
ENCI quarry

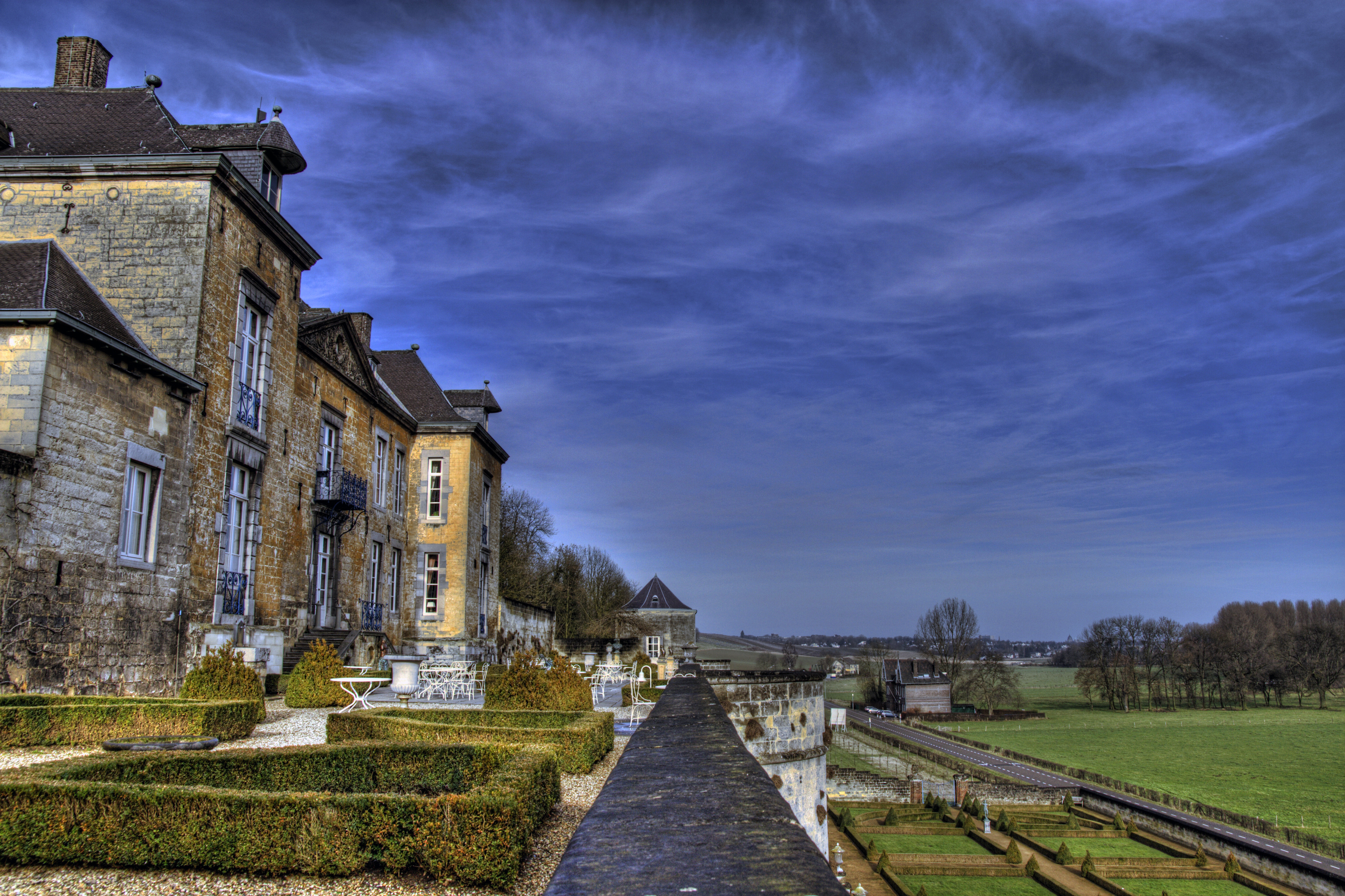
Château Neercanne

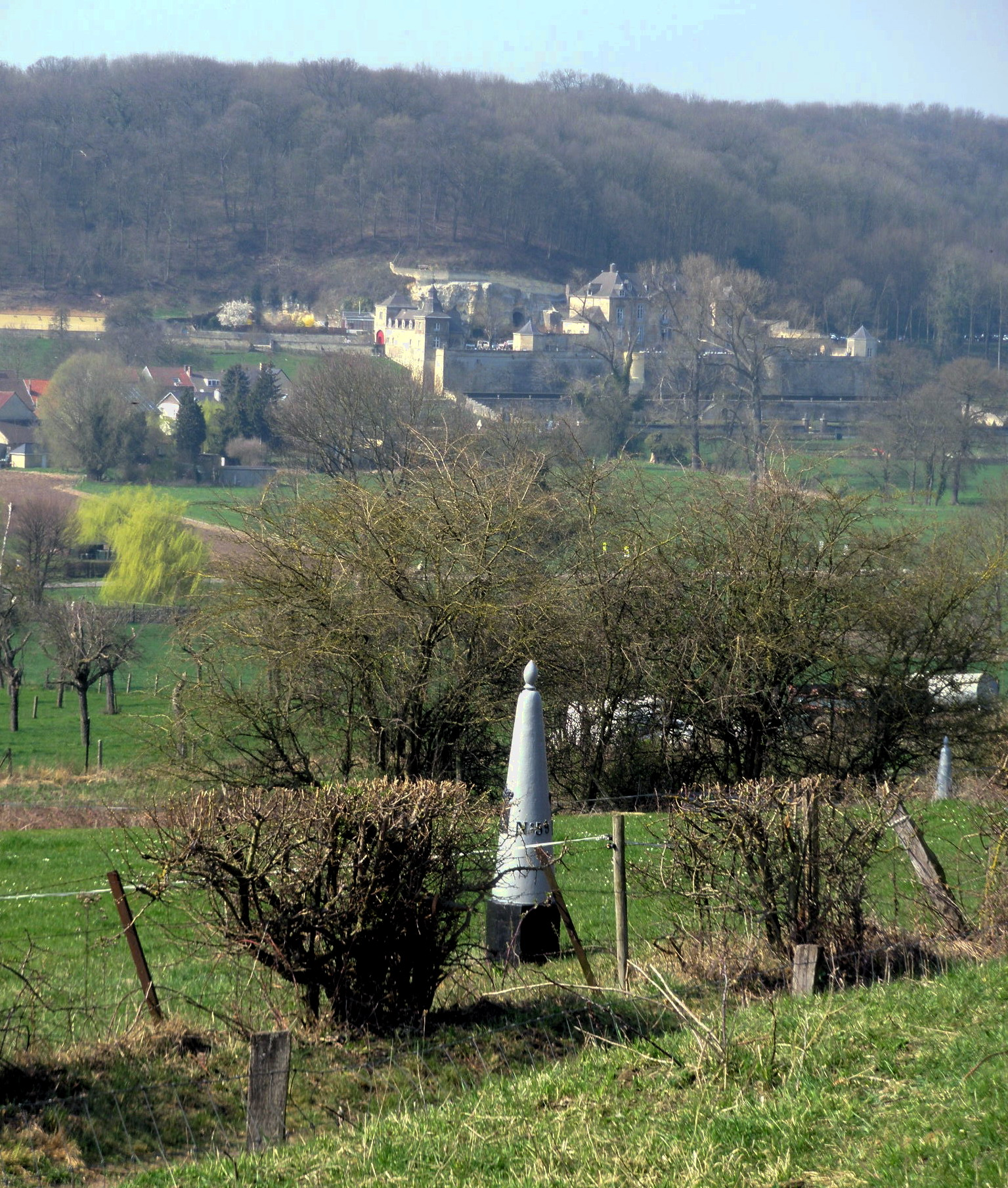
View on Cannerberg
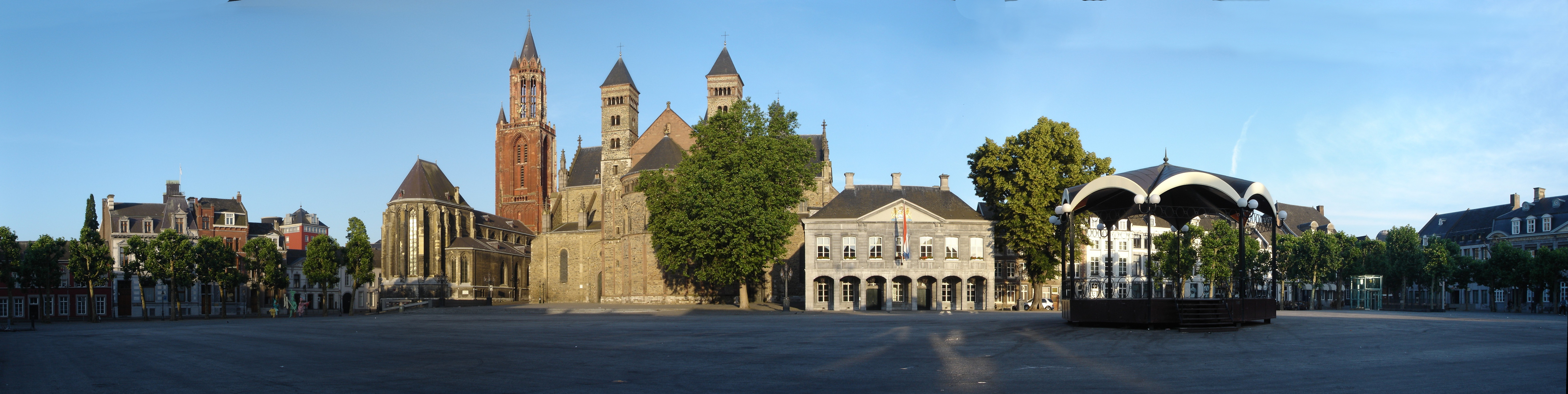
Vrijthof square, early morning

== See also ==
- Jewish inhabitants of Maastricht
- Maastricht Treaty
- Treaty of Maastricht (1843)
- The Maastrichtian Age, which marks the end of the Cretaceous Period and Mesozoic Era of geological time
