= Binnenstad =

Binnenstad (Dutch, 'Inner city') may refer to the following places in the Netherlands:

- Binnenstad (Amsterdam)
- Binnenstad (Maastricht)
- Binnenstad (tram stop) in Utrecht

== See also ==
- Inner city
- City centre
