= Hoge Brug =

Bridge in Maastricht, Netherlands

Hoge Brug / Hoeg Brögk
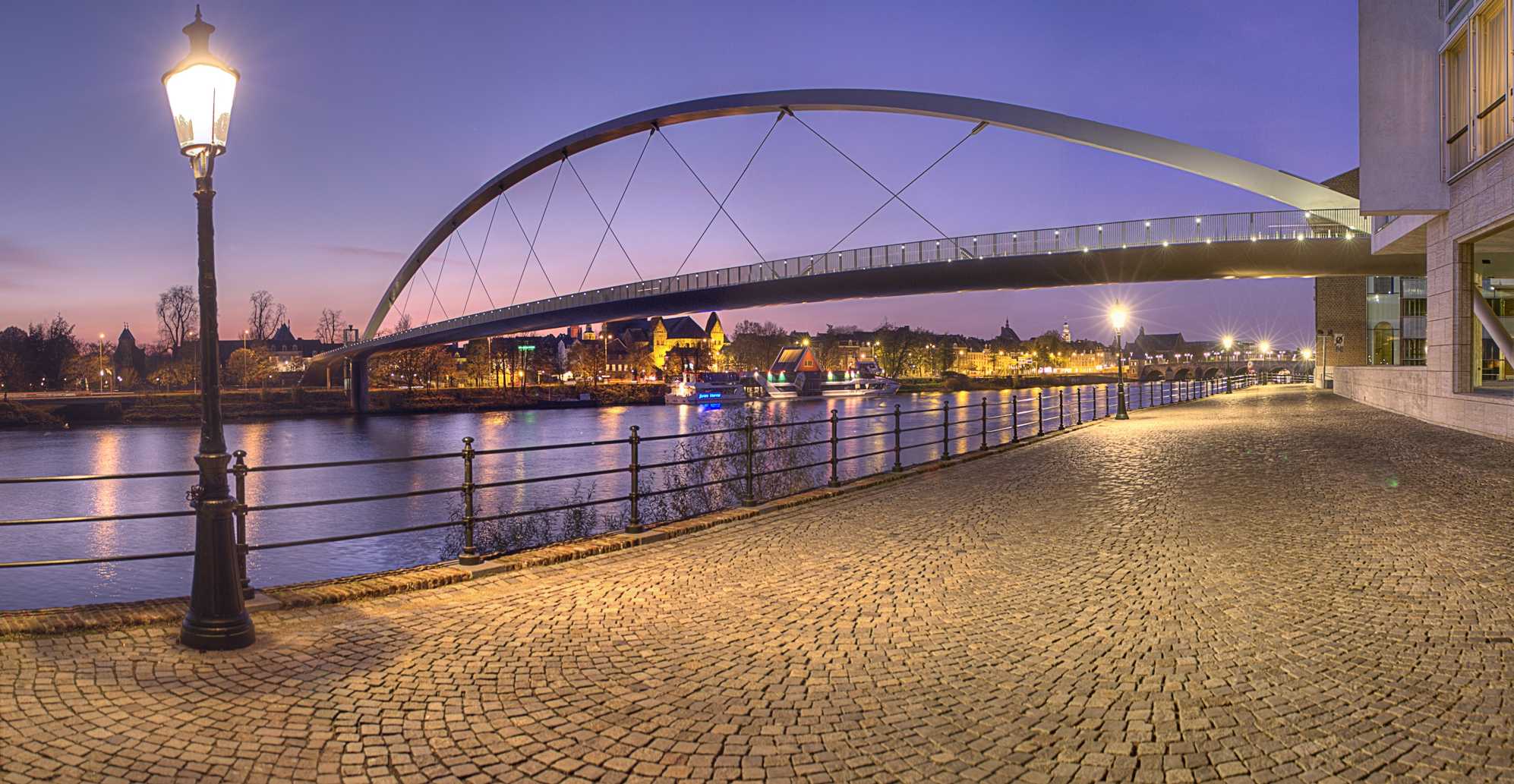
- The Hoge Brug, viewed from the Céramique area on the eastern bank of the Maas
- Coordinates: 50.8462°N 5.6973°E
- Carries: Pedestrians and bicycles
- Crosses: Meuse
- Locale: Maastricht (Binnenstad–Wyck/Céramique)
- Preceded by: John F. Kennedybrug
- Followed by: Sint Servaasbrug

Characteristics
- Design: Arch bridge
- Total length: 261 meters
- Width: 7.2 meter
- Height: 10 meters (bridge) / 26 meters (highest point of arch)

History
- Designer: René Greisch
- Opened: 2003; 23 years ago

Location
- Interactive map of Hoge Brug / Hoeg Brögk

The Hoge Brug (pronounced [ˈɦoːɣə ˈbrʏx]; Dutch for 'high bridge'), also known by its Maastrichtian dialect name Hoeg Brögk (pronounced [ɦuɣ ˈbʀœk]), is a pedestrian and cycle bridge that spans the Meuse (Dutch: Maas) in Maastricht, Netherlands.

== Gallery ==
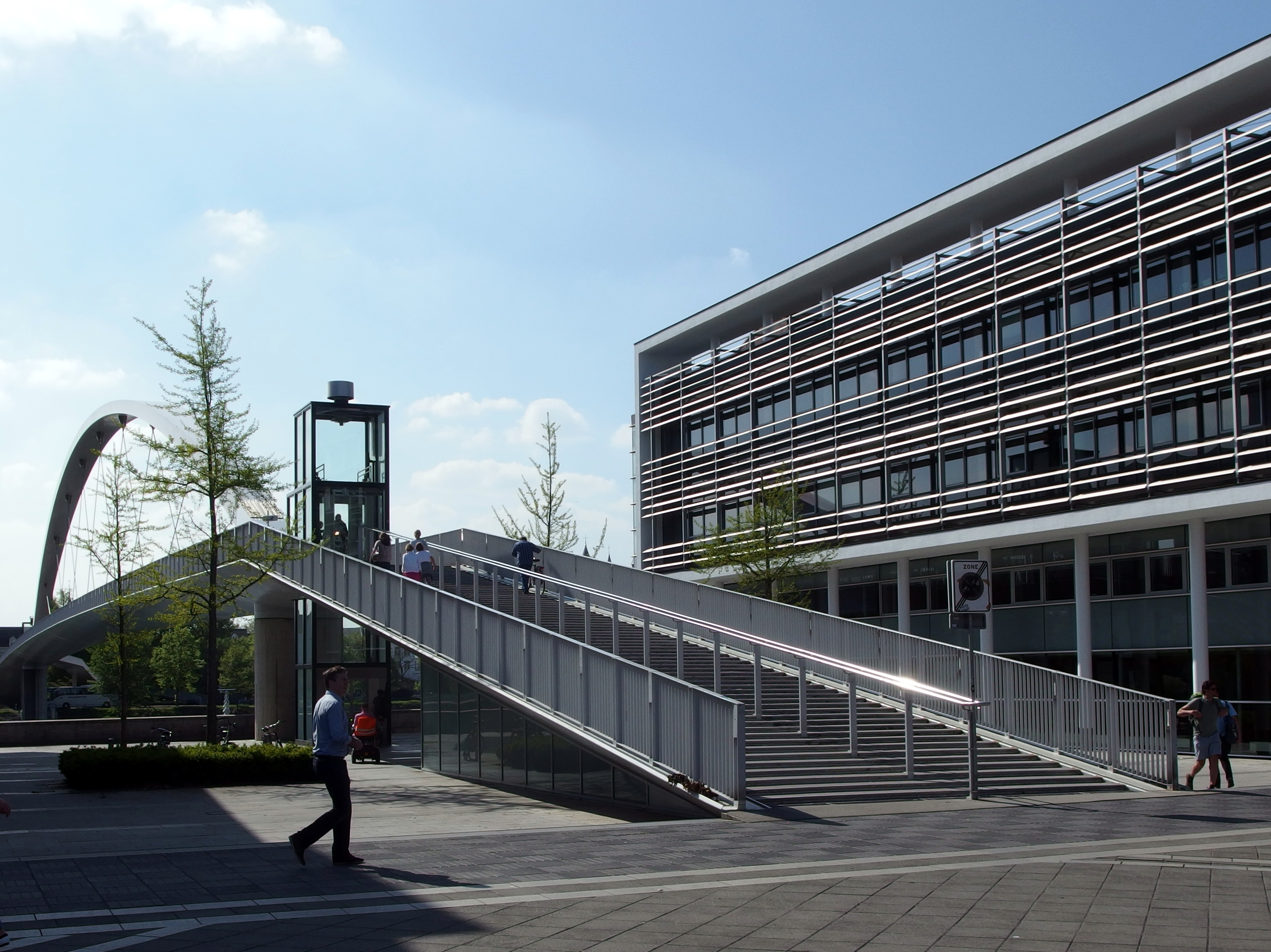
Entrance to the Hoge Brug on the eastern bank of the Meuse.

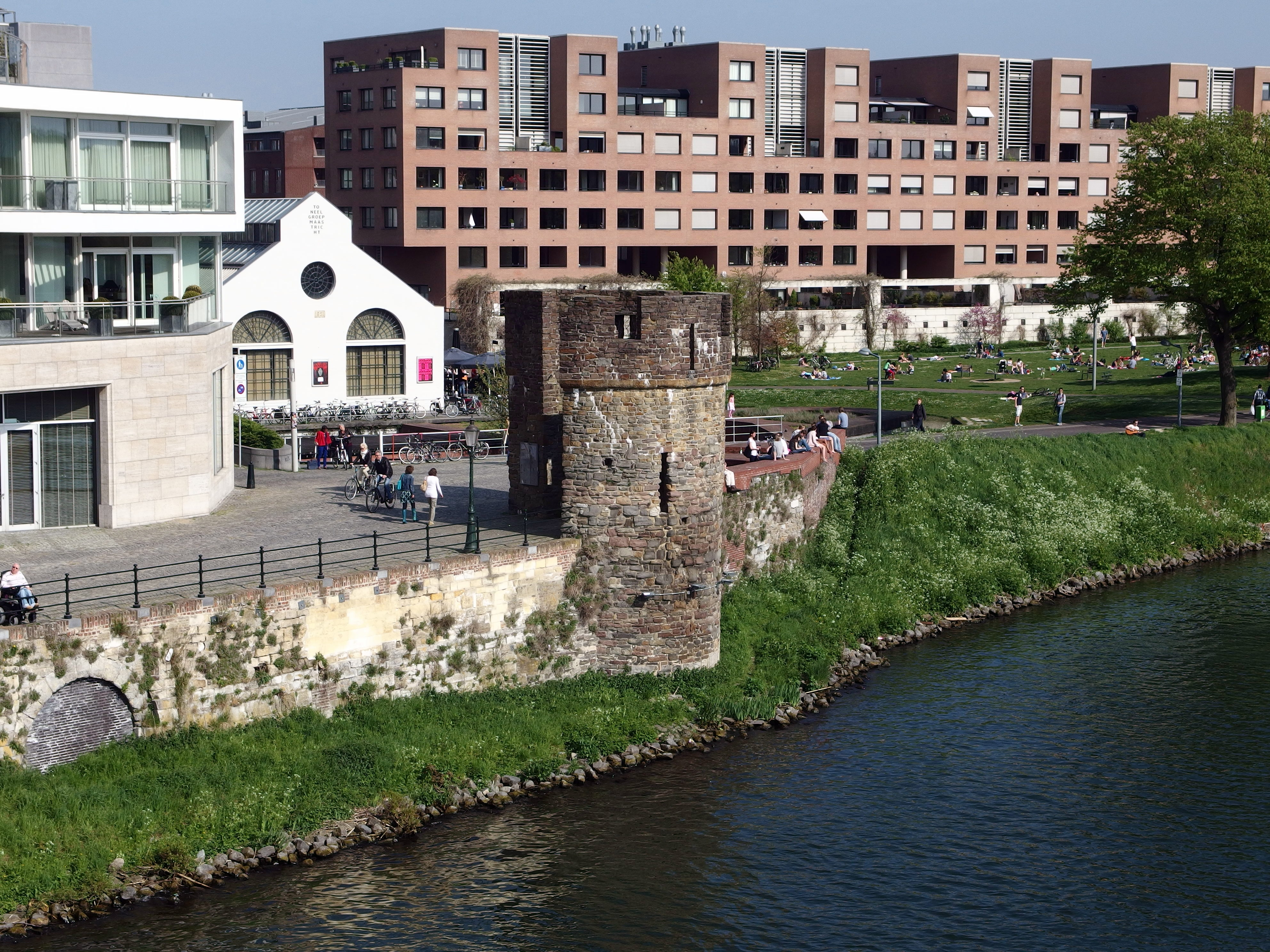
View of the Céramique section of Wyck (eastern Meuse bank) taken from the bridge.

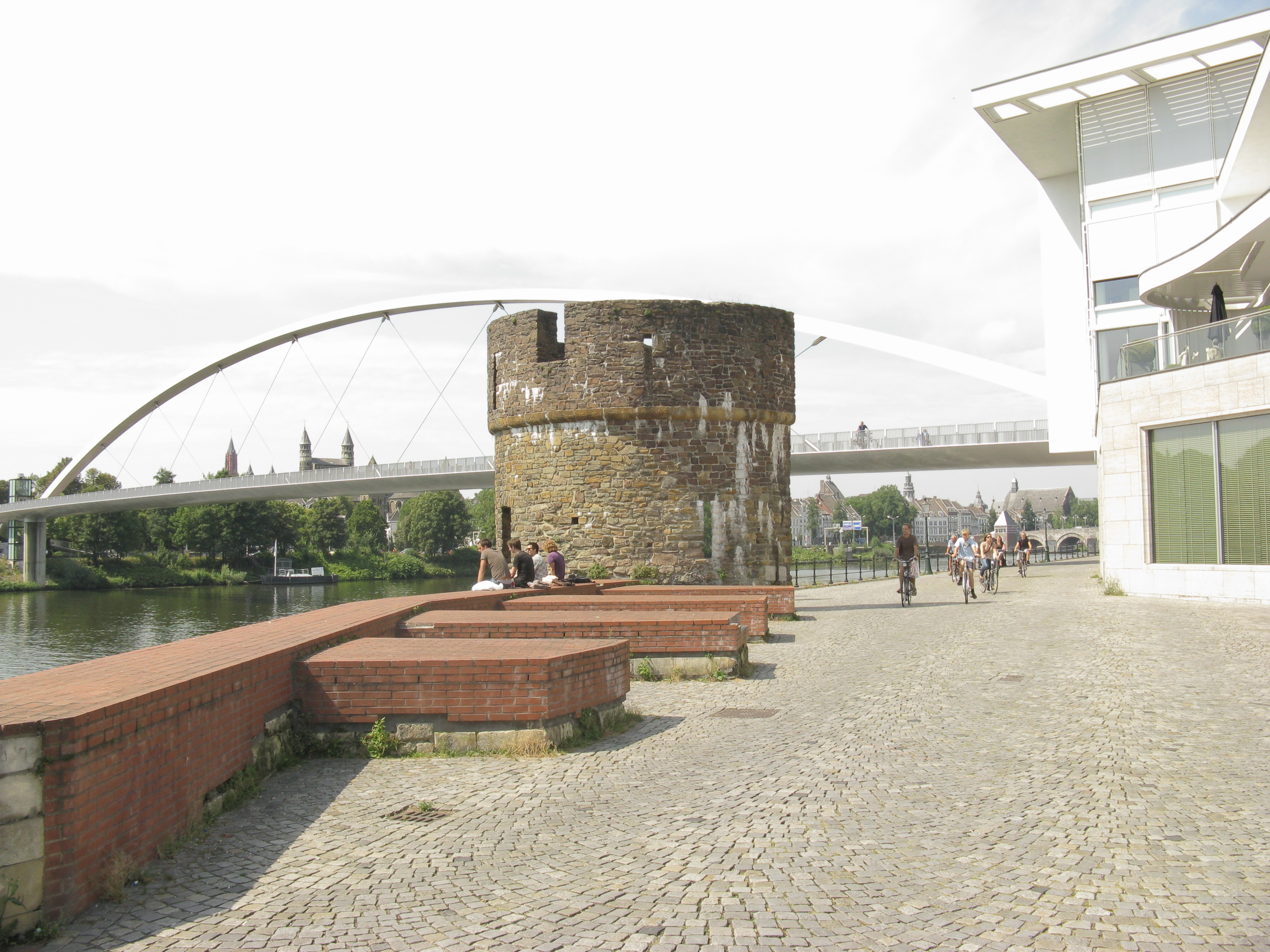
View of the Hoge Brug from the eastern Meuse bank.
