= Sint Servaasbrug =

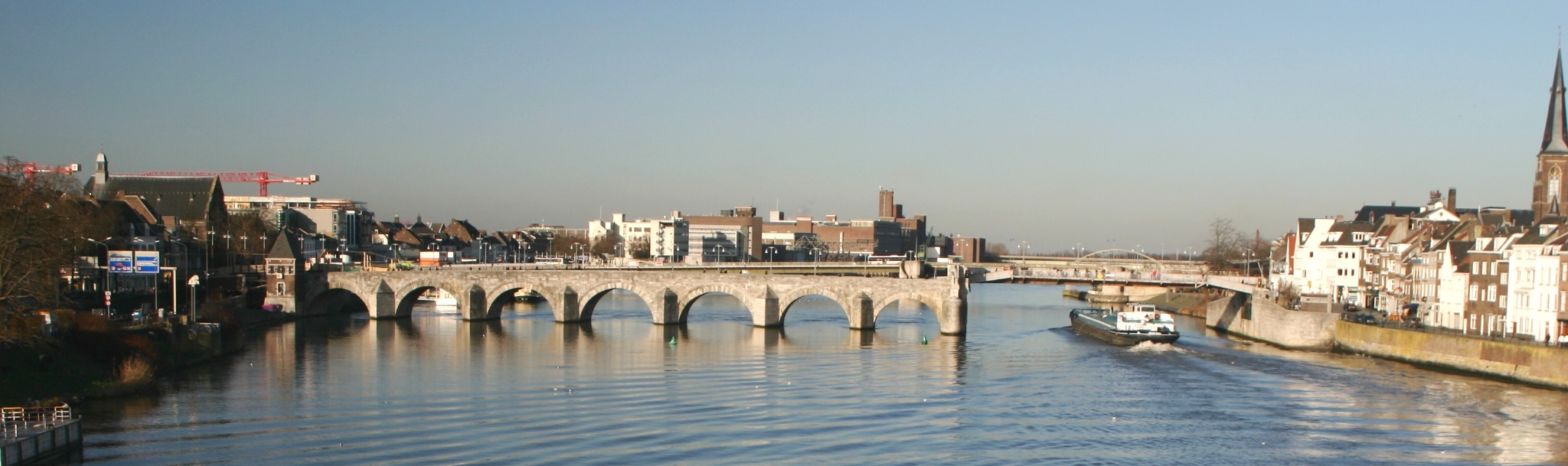
- Sint Servaasbrug from the south
- Coordinates: 50°50′57″N 5°41′45″E
- Crosses: Meuse
- Locale: Maastricht, Netherlands
- Named for: Saint Servatius
- Preceded by: Hoge Brug
- Followed by: Wilhelminabrug

Characteristics
- Design: Arch bridge
- Material: Limestone with a concrete core
- Total length: 160 m (524.9 ft)
- Width: 9 m (29.5 ft)

History
- Construction start: 1280; 746 years ago
- Construction end: 1298; 728 years ago

Location
- Interactive map of Sint Servaasbrug

Sint Servaasbrug (Dutch pronunciation: [sɪnt ˈsɛrvaːzbrʏx]; or the St. Servatius Bridge) is an arched stone cyclist and pedestrian bridge across the river Meuse in Maastricht, Netherlands. It is named after Saint Servatius, the first bishop of Maastricht, and (despite being largely rebuilt after World War II) it has been called the oldest bridge in the Netherlands.

== Description ==
The Sint Servaasbrug connects pedestrian traffic from the Binnenstad district of Maastricht on the west bank of the Meuse (the most central part of the city) to the Wyck district on the east bank.

The bridge is made of limestone, and in its current configuration it is 160 metres (525 ft) long and 9 metres (30 ft) wide. Its seven arches each span approximately 12 metres (39 ft), and are supported by seven piers. A separate steel drawbridge with a span of 54.5 metres (178 ft 10 in) connects the east end of the bridge to the east bank of the river.

== History ==
The Romans built a wooden bridge across the Meuse in what is now Maastricht, in approximately AD 50, and the Latin phrase for "crossing of the Meuse", "mosae trajectum", became the name of the city. For many years this remained the only crossing of the lower Meuse. However, the Roman bridge collapsed in the year 1275 from the weight of a large procession, killing 400 people. Its replacement, the present bridge, was built somewhat to the north of the older crossing between 1280 and 1298; The Roman Catholic Church encouraged its construction by providing indulgences to people who helped build it. The bridge was named in honor of Saint Servatius around this time.

The bridge was renovated in 1680, and in 1825 a wooden strutwork section on the east side of the bridge was replaced by a stone arch. In 1850, as part of the construction of the Maastricht-Liège Canal, a channel was cut on the west side of the bridge.

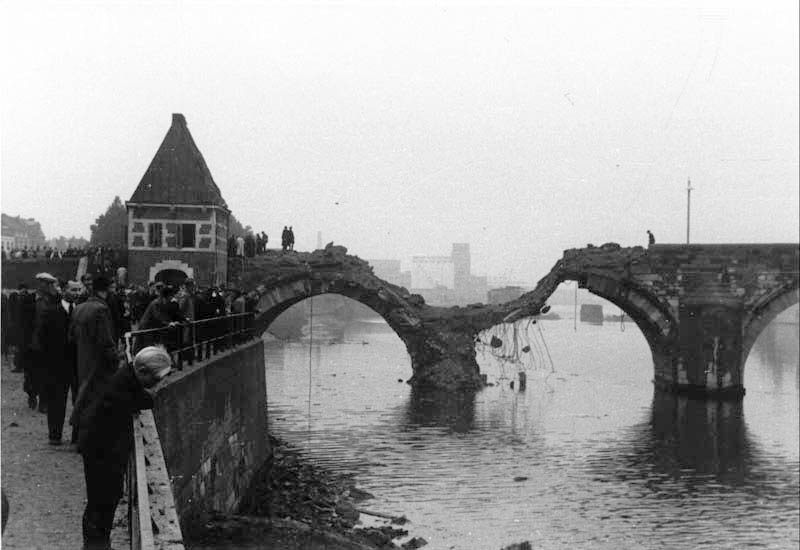
The bridge showing the damage inflicted by the retreating German Army. Taken 14 September 1944 after Allied Forces occupied the city.

In the early 1930s the construction of the Wilhelmina Bridge, 300 metres (1,000 ft) downstream relieved the bridge of its function as the city's only river crossing. Thereafter major renovation was performed. The arches were reconstructed in concrete, covered with the original stones. Underwater, counter-arches were constructed to prevent erosion of the river bed on which the bridge was built. Two arches on the eastern end of the bridge were removed and replaced by a vertical-lift bridge. Between the two bridges, on the eastern side of the river, a levee was built to separate the navigable eastern channel from the rest of the river.

During World War II the bridge was severely damaged by the German army as they retreated from the city in 1944, and it was rebuilt in 1948. In 1962, the shipping channel to the east of the bridge was spanned by a steel drawbridge attached to the main bridge.

In 1968 a Dutch postage stamp showing the bridge was issued.

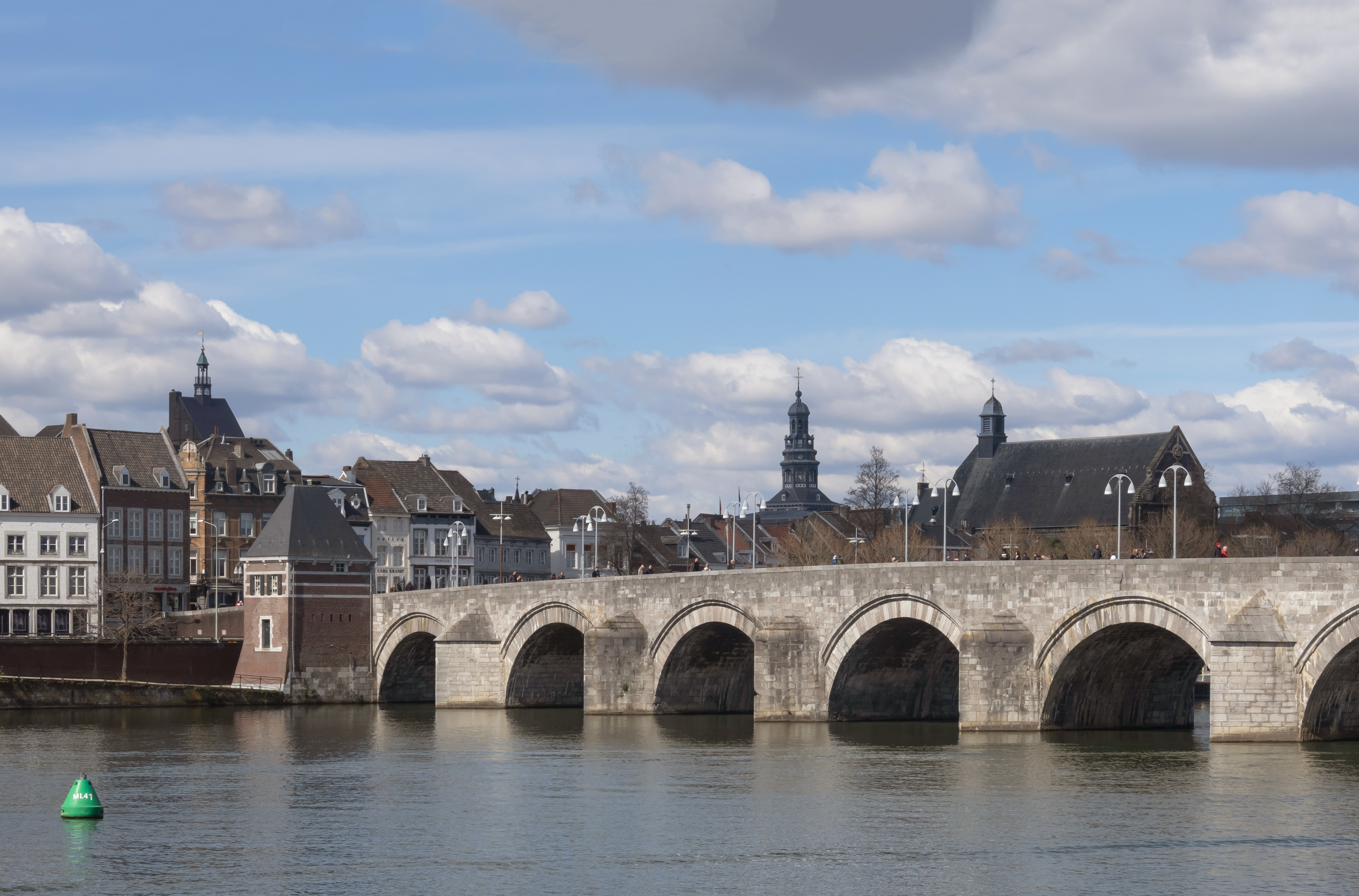
Servatius Bridge with a view to the center

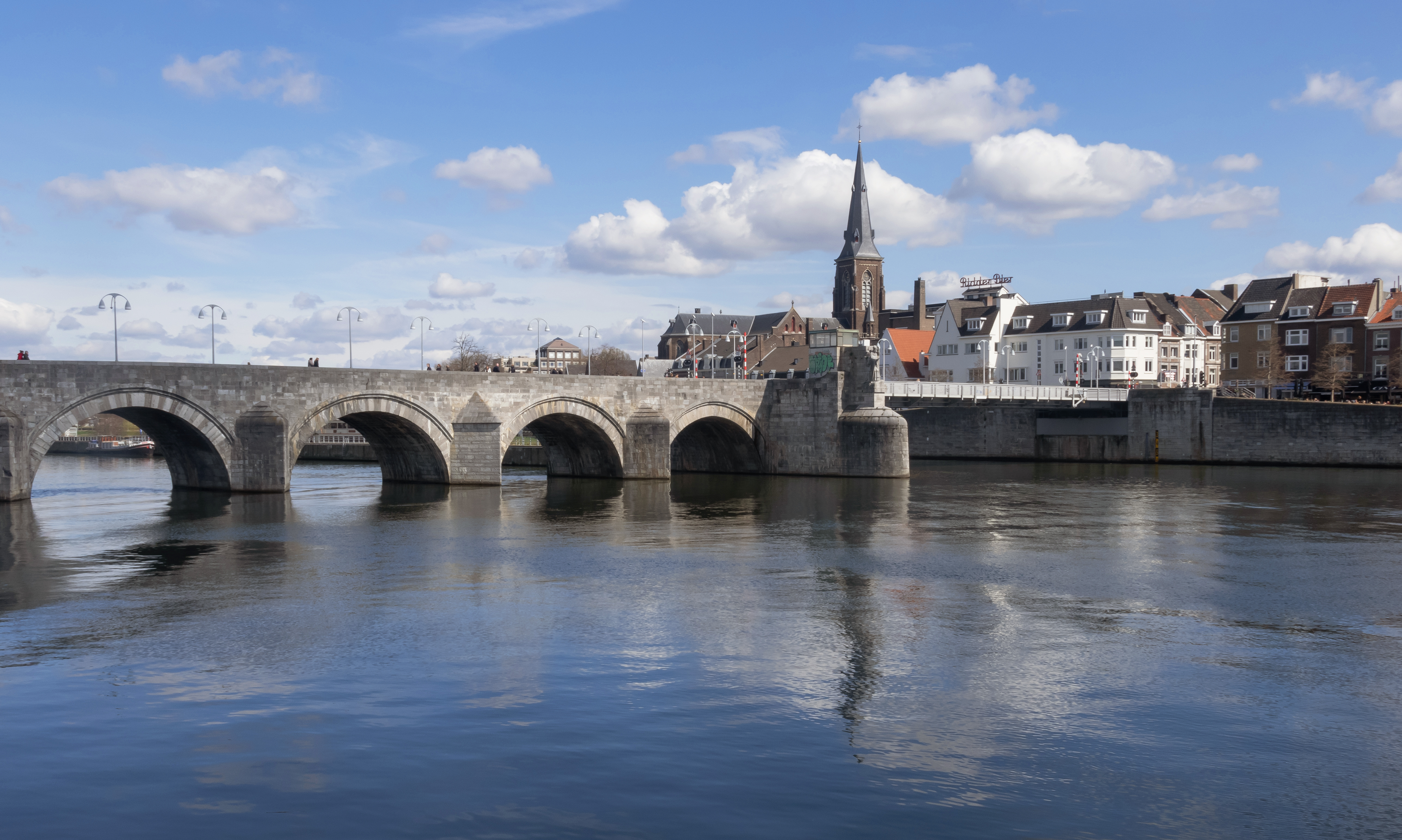
Servatius Bridge with a view to Wijck
