= Beluga (restaurant) =

Coordinates: 50°50′45.93″N 5°41′55.75″E

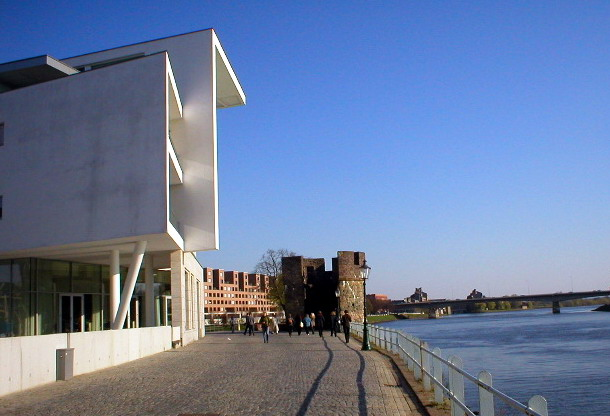
- Beluga (left) on the bank of the river Maas
- Interactive map of Beluga

Restaurant information
- Established: 1997
- Head chef: Servais Tielman
- Food type: French
- Rating: Michelin Guide
- Location: 12, Plein 1992, Maastricht, Netherlands
- Website: www.rest-beluga.com

Beluga is a restaurant on Plein 1992 in Maastricht, Netherlands. It is a fine dining restaurant that is awarded two Michelin stars from 2005 to 2019. It was awarded one Michelin star in the period 1998–2004 and 2020 to present. In 2011, GaultMillau gave the restaurant a rating of 19.5 out of 20.

The restaurant was established by chef Hans van Wolde in 1997. Originally it was located in Havenstraat in the old centre of Maastricht. In 2001 the restaurant moved to the ground floor of a new building by Jo Coenen on the banks of the river Maas in the posh neighbourhood Céramique. In the Summer of 2011 Van Wolde started Beluga Beach Club in a park along the Meuse river, as a temporary project.

== Other ratings ==
The independent food guide Lekker.nl places Beluga often in the top five of the "Lekker Top-100". In 2005 the restaurant placed fifth, advancing to second place in 2006. In 2007, Beluga placed first, ahead of three restaurants with three Michelin stars.
