= Binnenstad, Maastricht =

Coordinates: 50.8498°N 5.6890°E

Binnenstad
- Neighborhood of Maastricht
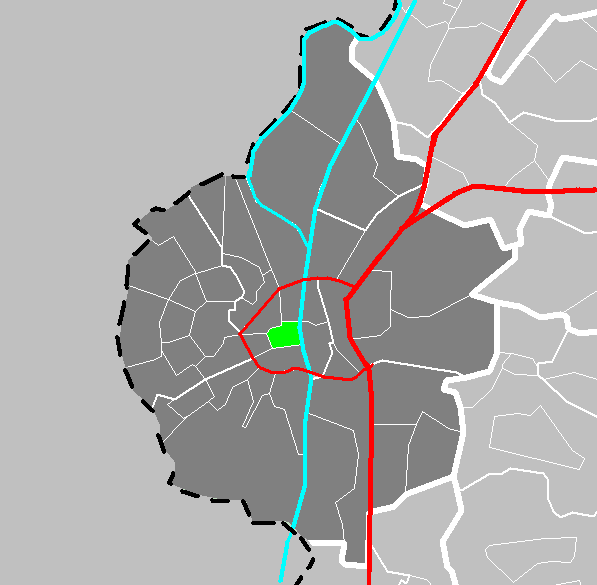
- Location of Binnenstad in Maastricht
- Municipality: Maastricht
- Province: Limburg
- Country: Netherlands

Area
  - Total: 34 ha (84 acres)

Population
  - Total: 1,645
  - Density: 4,800/km^{2} (13,000/sq mi)

Binnenstad (Dutch pronunciation: [ˈbɪnə(n)ˌstɑt]; Limburgish: Binnestad [ˈbɪnəˌstɑt]; English: Inner city) is a neighbourhood in Maastricht, Netherlands. Until 2007, it was officially named City. As its name suggests, it is the most centrally located area of Maastricht.

== Notable features ==
- Dinghuis, a medieval courthouse
- The Dominicanenkerk (Dominican Church), a former church now housing a book shop
- Entre Deux, a newly rebuilt shopping centre
- The 'Hoge Brug/Hoeg Brögk' (High Bridge, built 2003), connecting the Binnenstad to Wyck-Céramique
- The Markt with the city hall of Maastricht
- The Onze-Lieve-Vrouweplein with the Basilica of Our Lady, Maastricht (Basiliek van Onze-Lieve-Vrouw-Tenhemelopneming)
- The Vrijthof with the Basilica of Saint Servatius (Sint-Servaasbasiliek) and Protestant Sint-Janskerk
- Treasury of the Basilica of Saint Servatius
- Sint Servaasbrug, 13th-century arch-bridge over the Maas
- The Stokstraat area (Stokstraatkwartier)

== Impressions ==
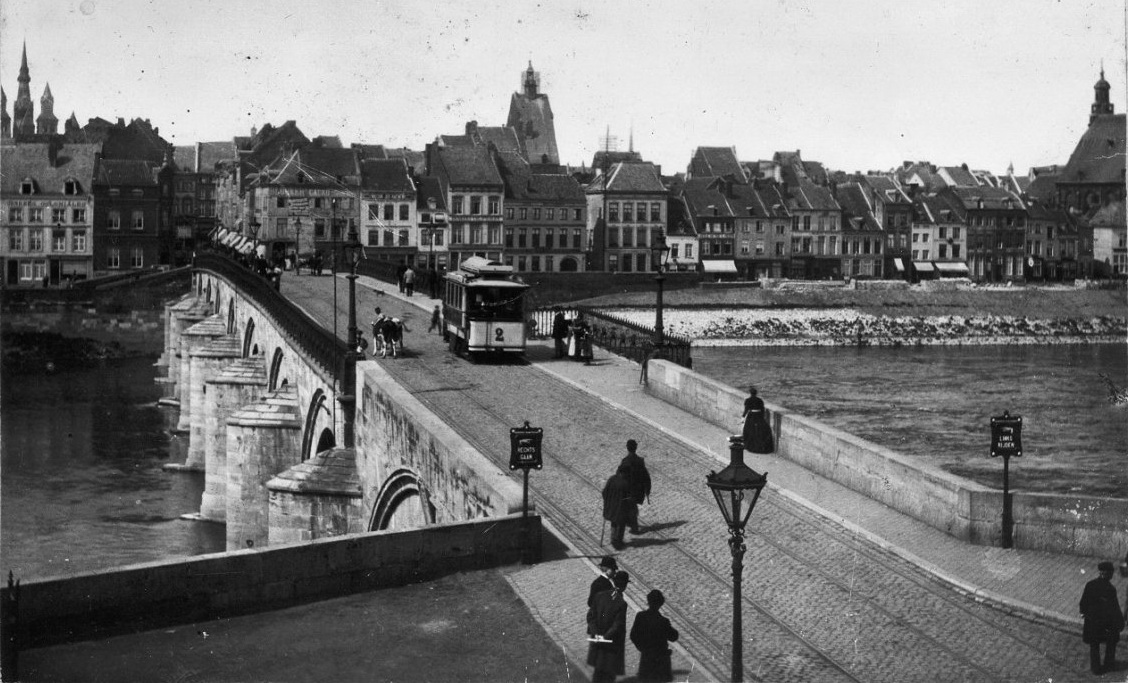
Historic picture of the Binnenstad seen from the opposite bank of the Maas

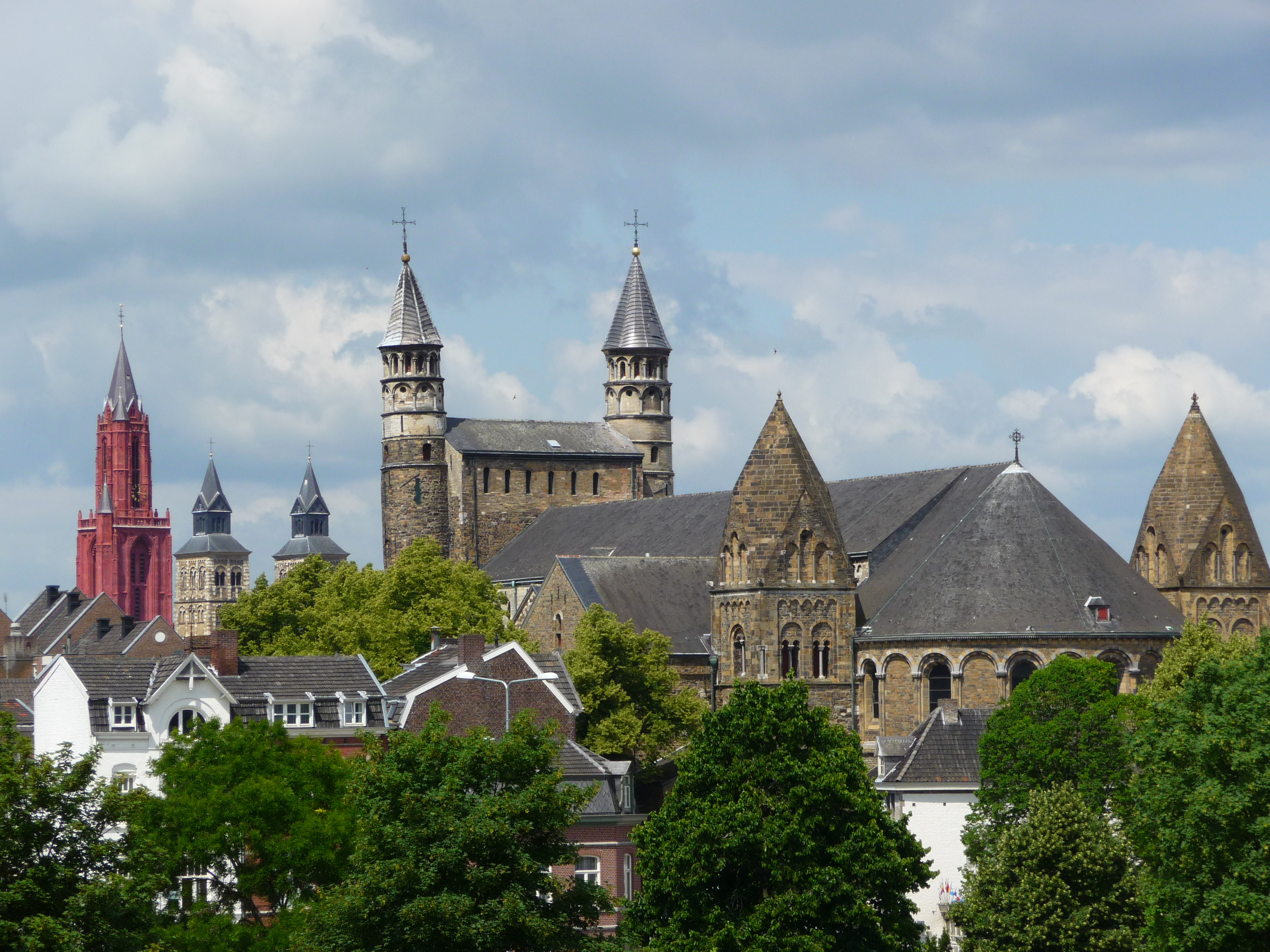
Panorama, with three churches (Onze-Lieve-Vrouwekerk, Sint-Janskerk and Sint-Servaasbasiliek)

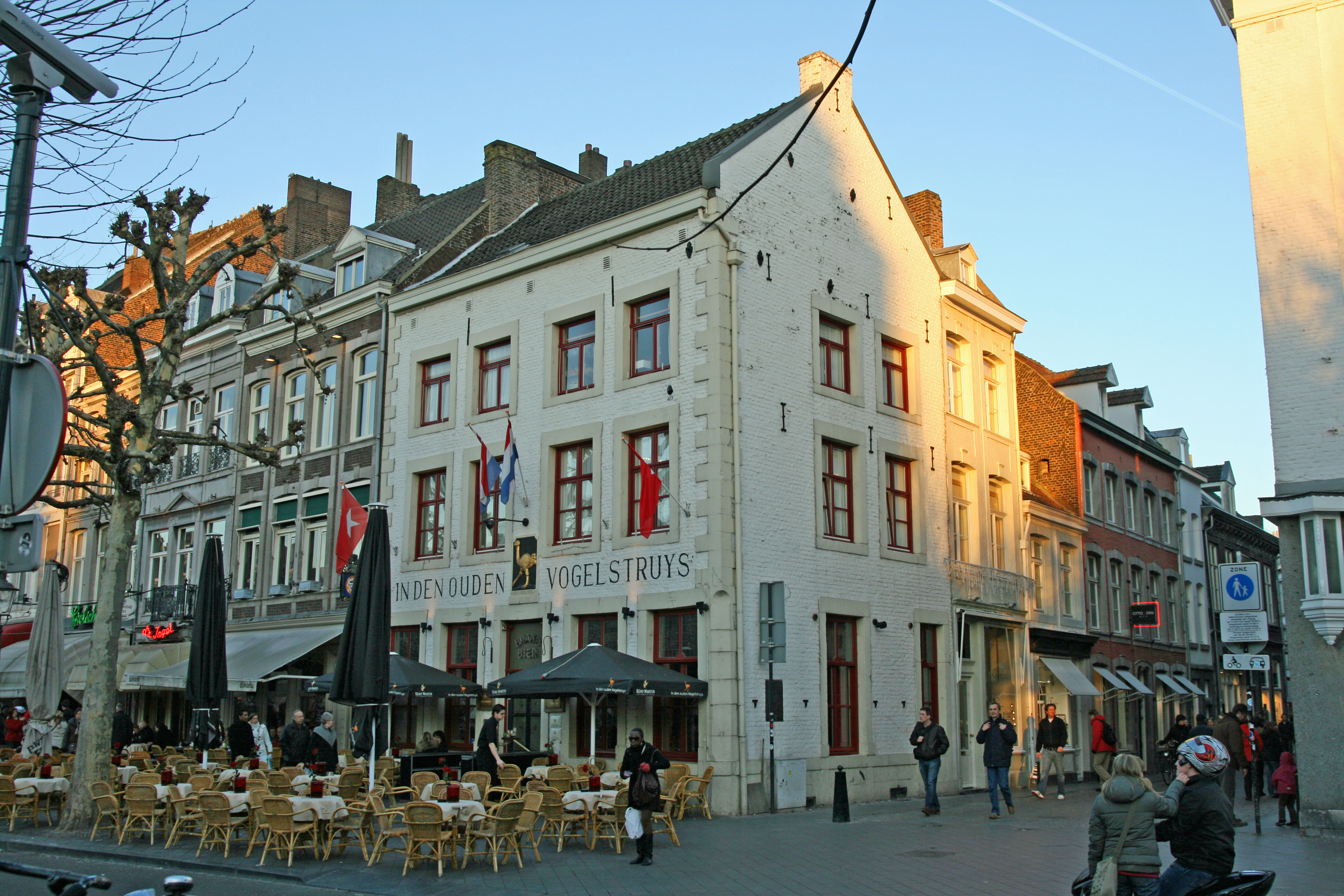
Pubs on the Vrijthof square

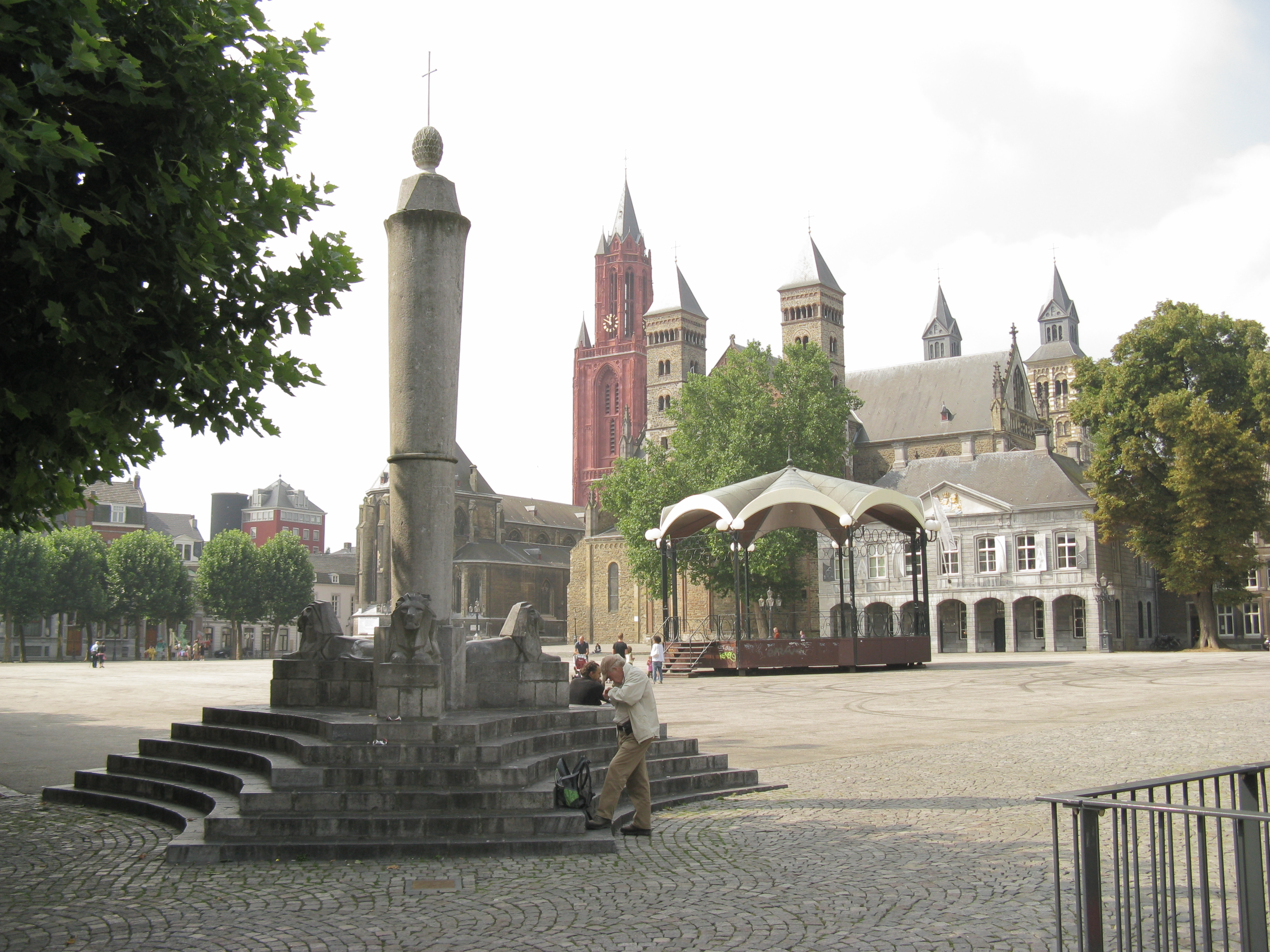
View of the Vrijthof square, with the Maastrichtian perron in the foreground

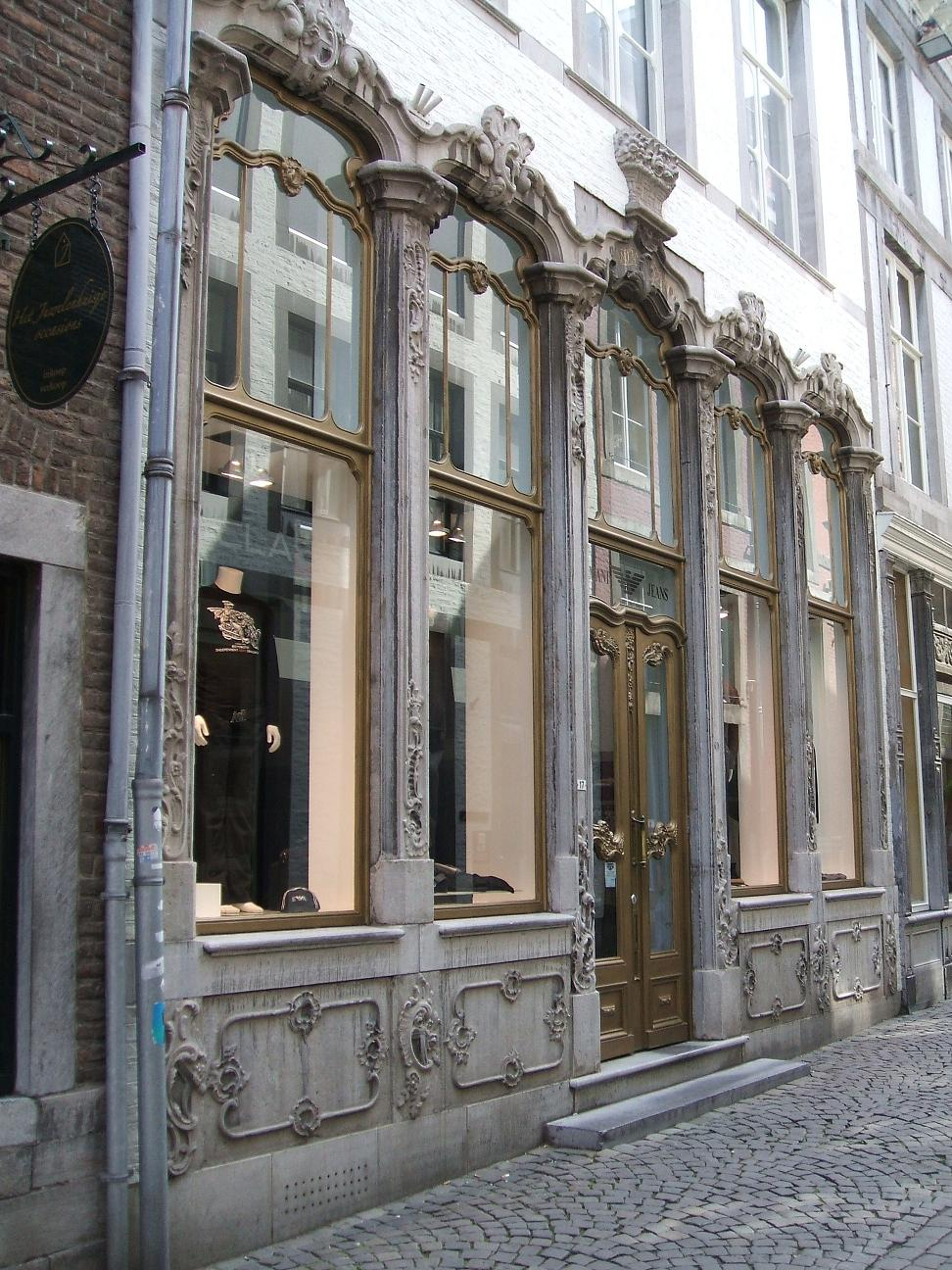
Shop in the Stokstraatkwartier

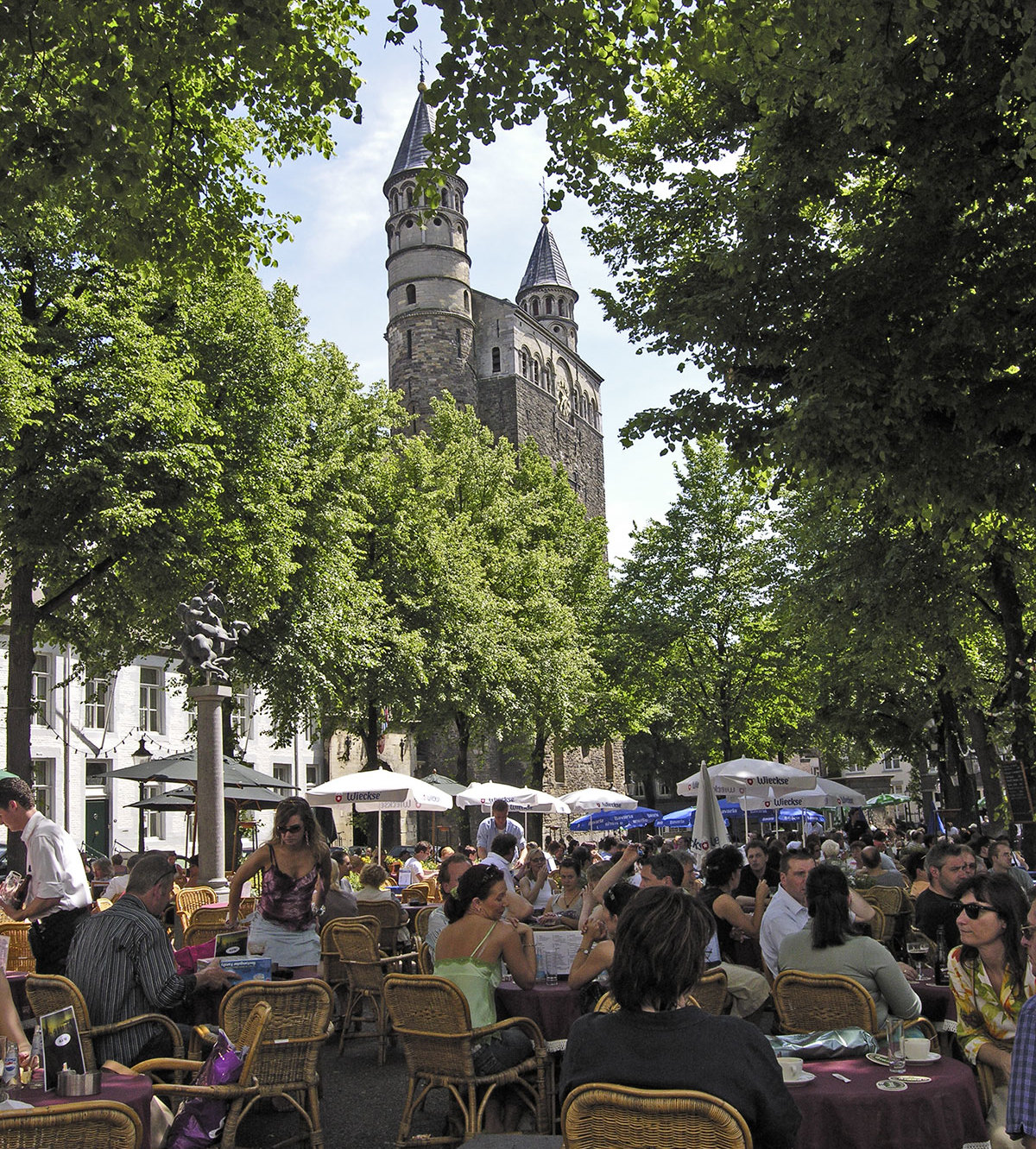
The Onze-Lieve-Vrouweplein

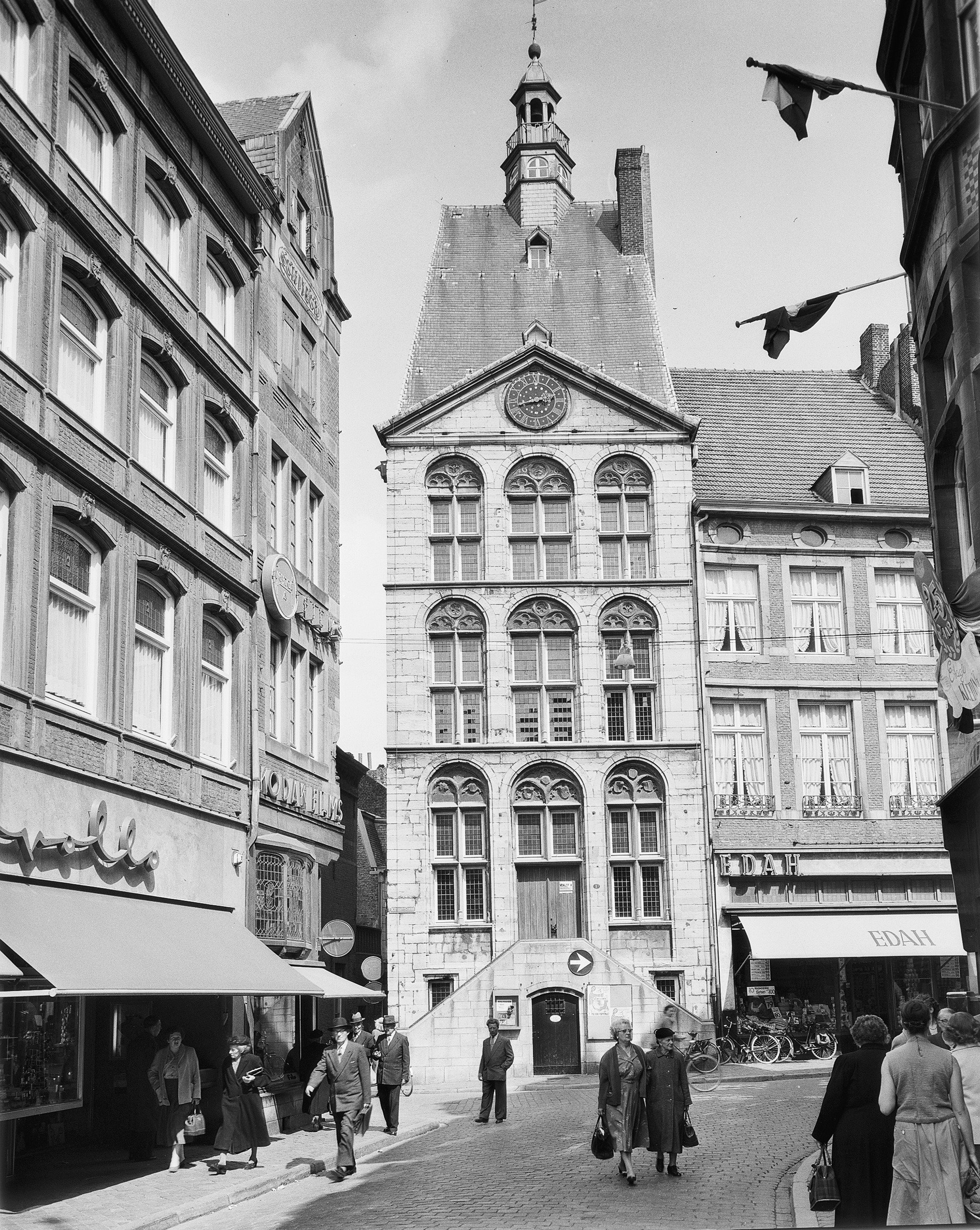
Dinghuis and the Kleine Staat street, as it looked in 1957
