= Wyck, Maastricht =

Neighbourhood in Maastricht, Netherlands

Coordinates: 50°50′58″N 05°42′07″E

Wyck
- neighbourhood
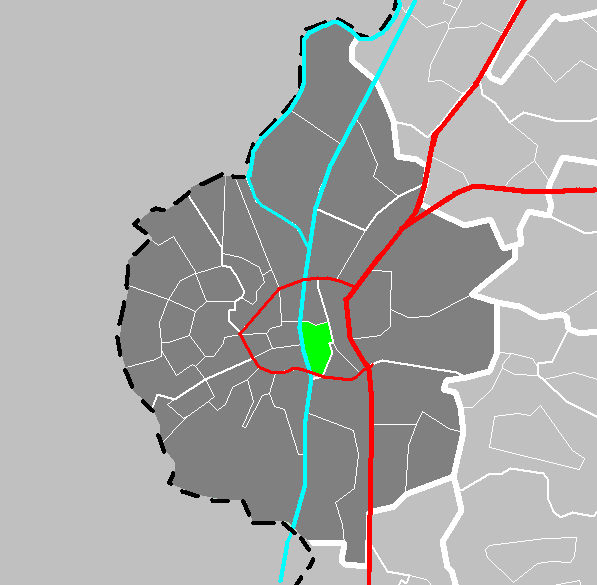
- Location of Wyck in Maastricht
- Municipality: Maastricht
- Province: Limburg
- Country: Netherlands

Area
  - Total: 64 ha (160 acres)

Population
  - Total: 4,600 (Wyck-Céramique combined)
  - Density: 7,200/km^{2} (19,000/sq mi)

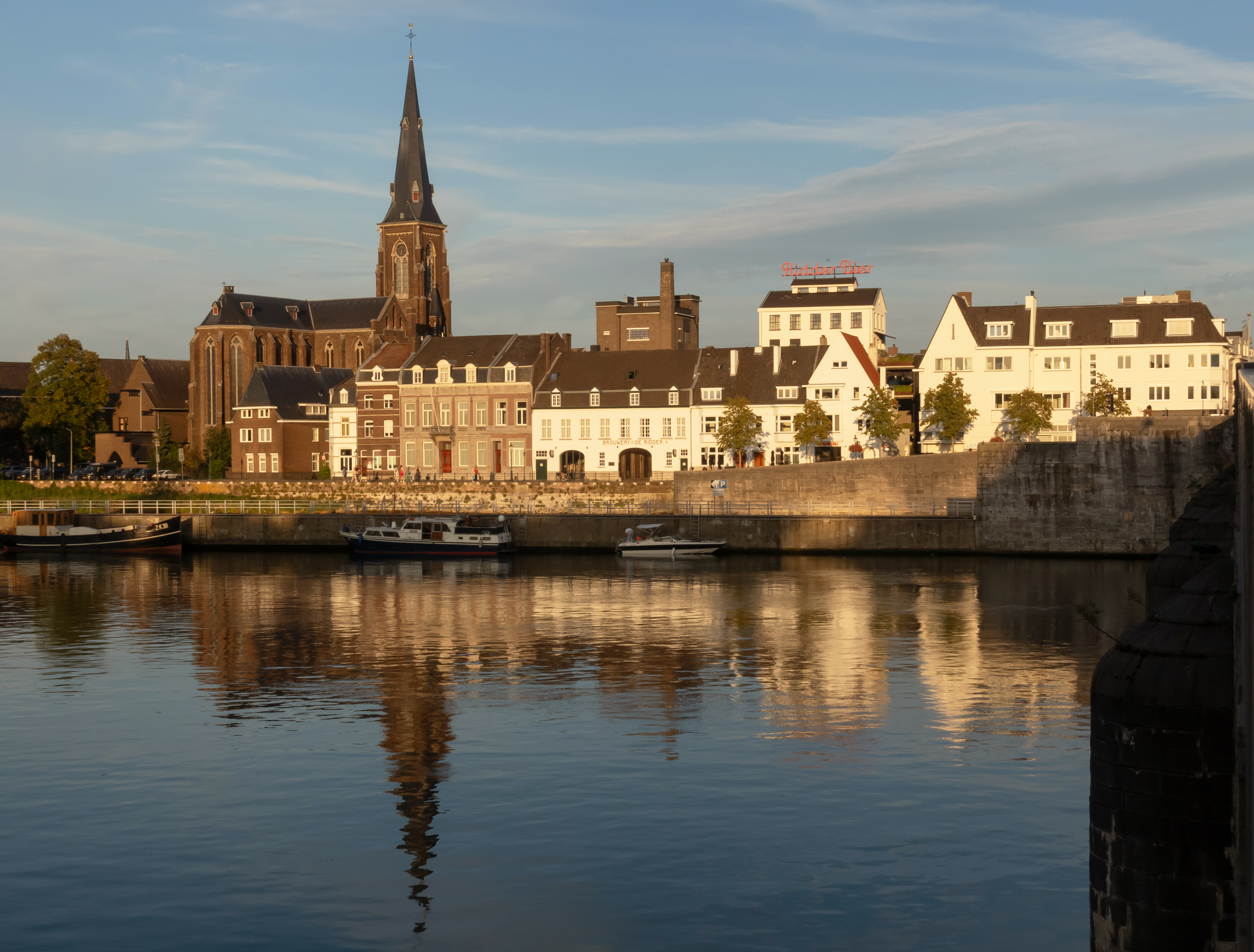
Maastricht, Wijck district with the church (Sint-Martinuskerk) from the bridge (Sint-Servaasbrug)

Wyck (Dutch: [ʋik]; Limburgish: Wiek [wiːk˦]) is a neighbourhood in Maastricht, Netherlands, comprising the eastern bank of the Meuse (Dutch: Maas) in the city's historic centre.

== Areas ==
The neighbourhood consists of three distinct parts:

- Oud-Wyck ("Old Wyck"), comprising the oldest built-up area, until 1867 surrounded by Maastricht's Medieval city wall.
- Stationsbuurt ("Station Neighbourhood"), the area west of the railway and Maastricht railway station, predominantly dating from the 19th century.
- Céramique, on the former factory grounds of Société Céramique south of Old Wyck, redeveloped during the 1990s/2000s. The area consists mostly of new-built apartment blocks, designed by international architects, and some restored factory buildings. The Bonnefantenmuseum, designed by Aldo Rossi, is a major landmark along the Meuse river. Though sometimes seen as a neighbourhood in itself, Céramique is officially part of Wyck.

== Notable features ==
- Beluga (restaurant)
- Bonnefantenmuseum
- Centre Céramique, Maastricht's main public library

== Impressions ==
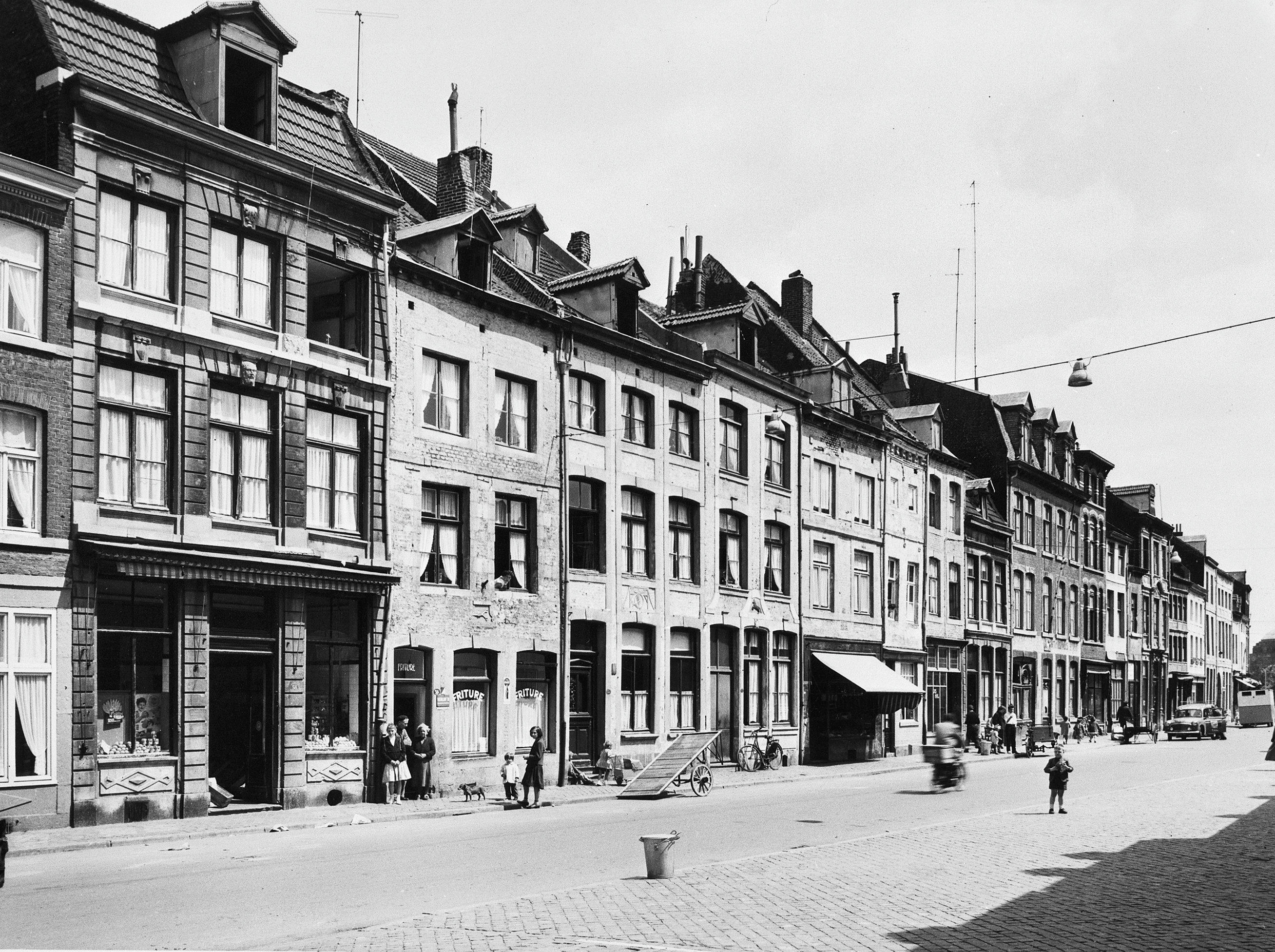
Oud-Wyck during the 1950s

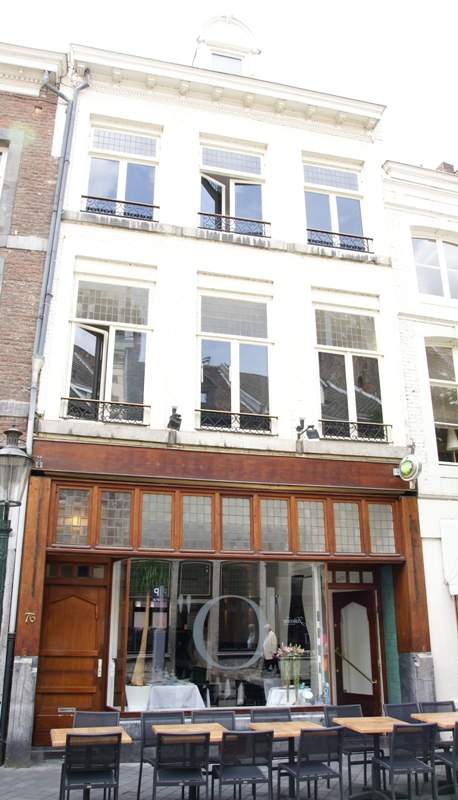
Typical architecture of Oud-Wyck (national monument 27883)

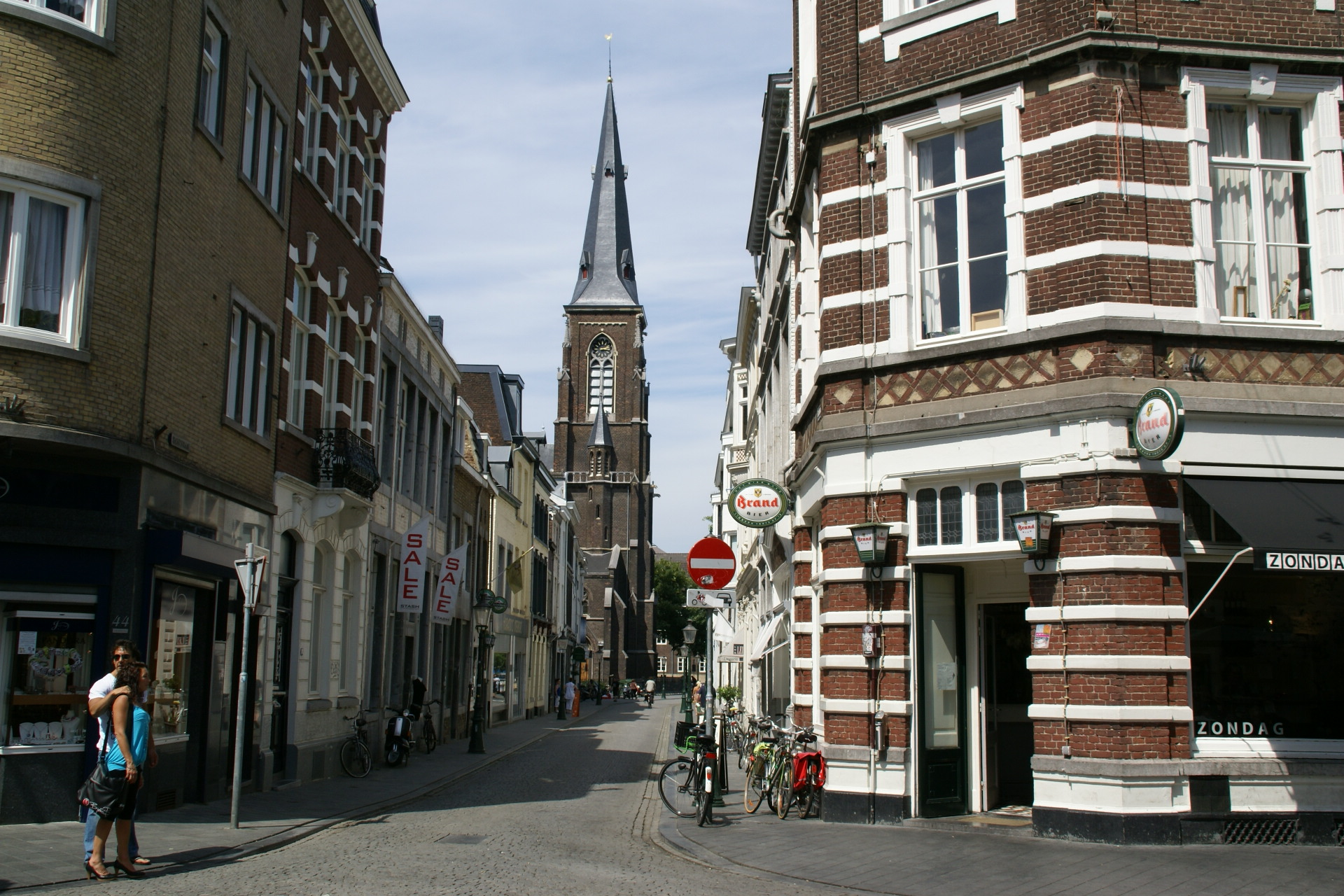
Typical street in Oud-Wyck

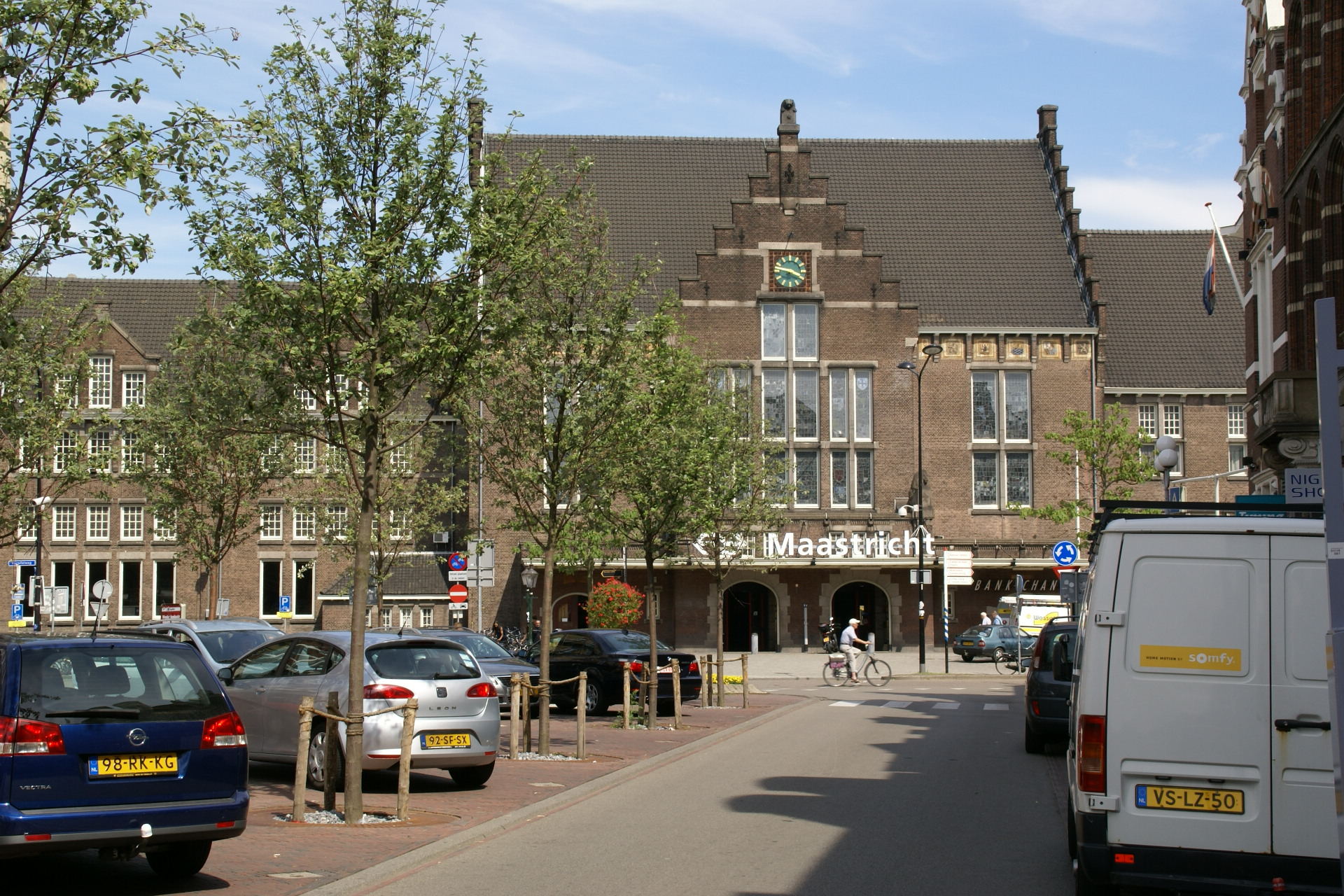
Maastricht railway station

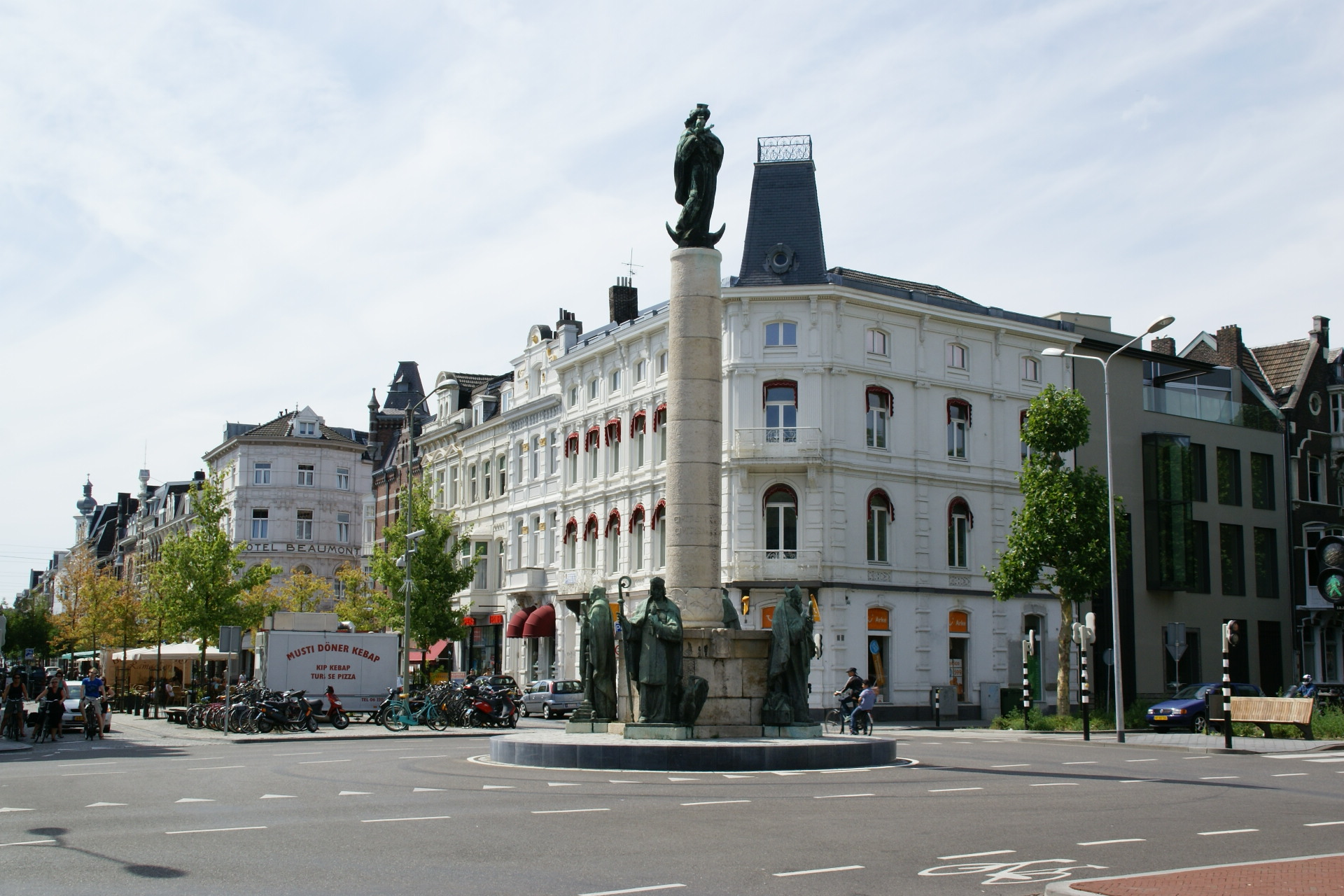
Intersection

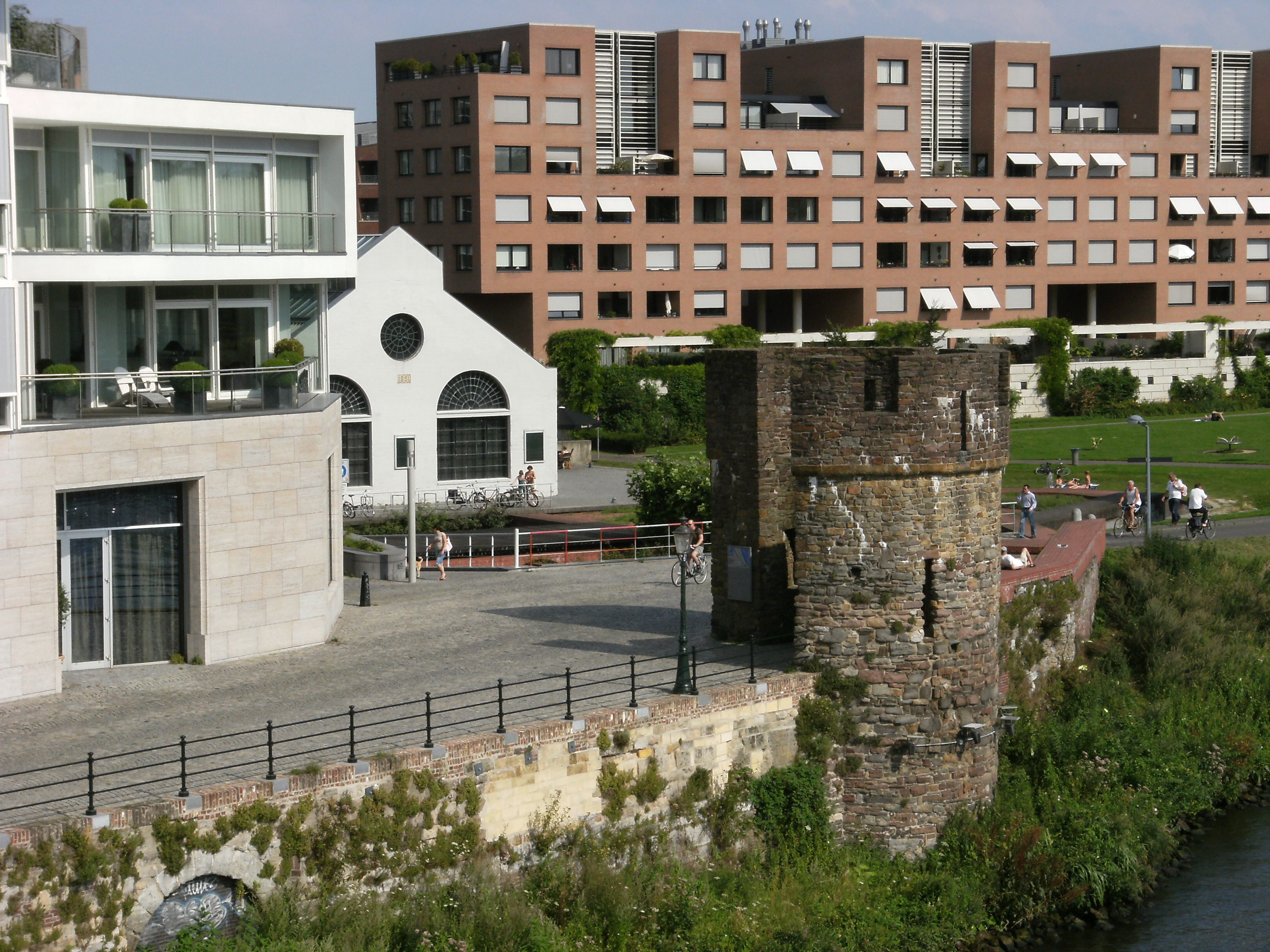
Céramique: View onto the 1990s/2000s built apartment blocks and a theatre housed in an older building (centre)

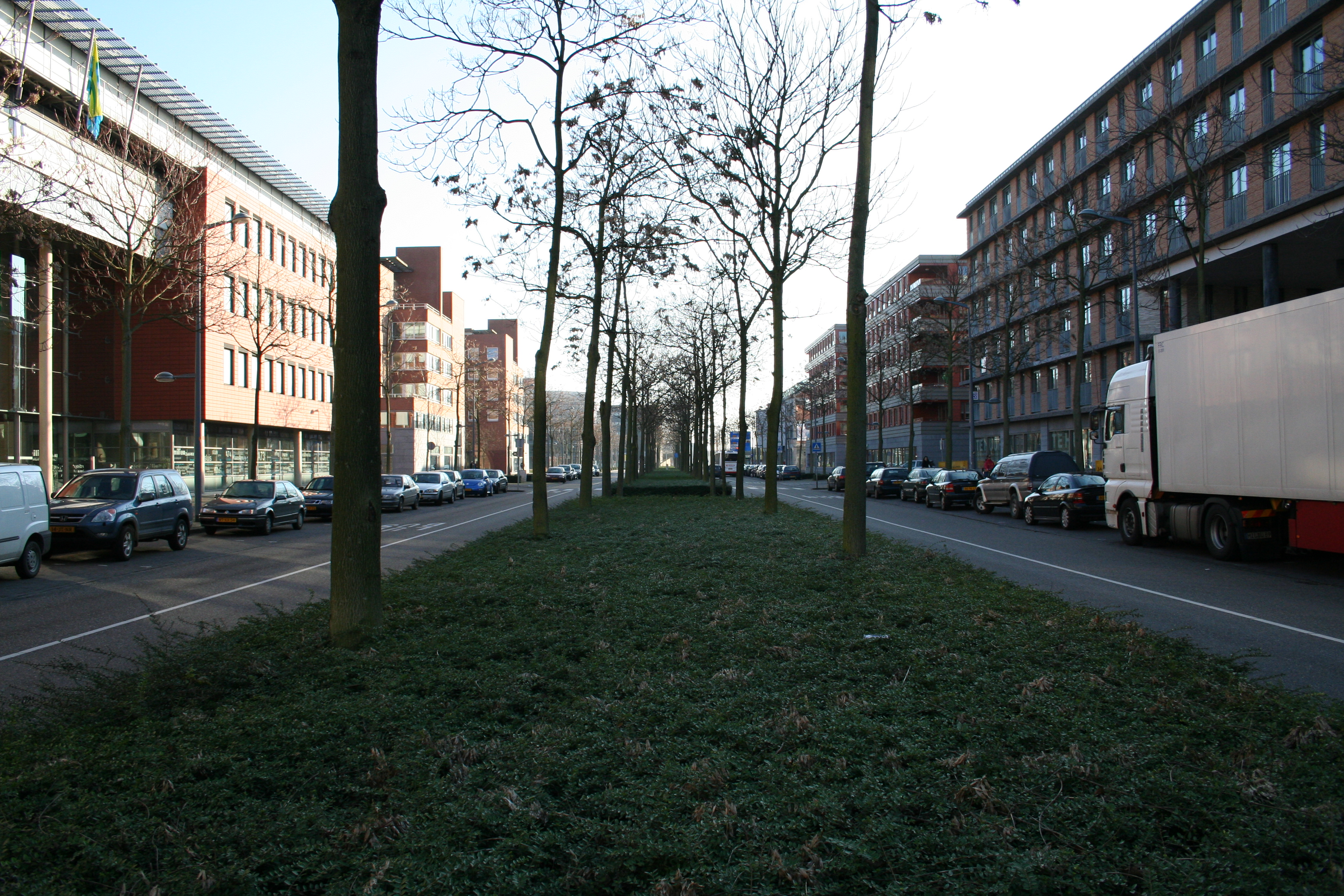
Céramique: view of Avenue Céramique, Céramique's main thoroughfare

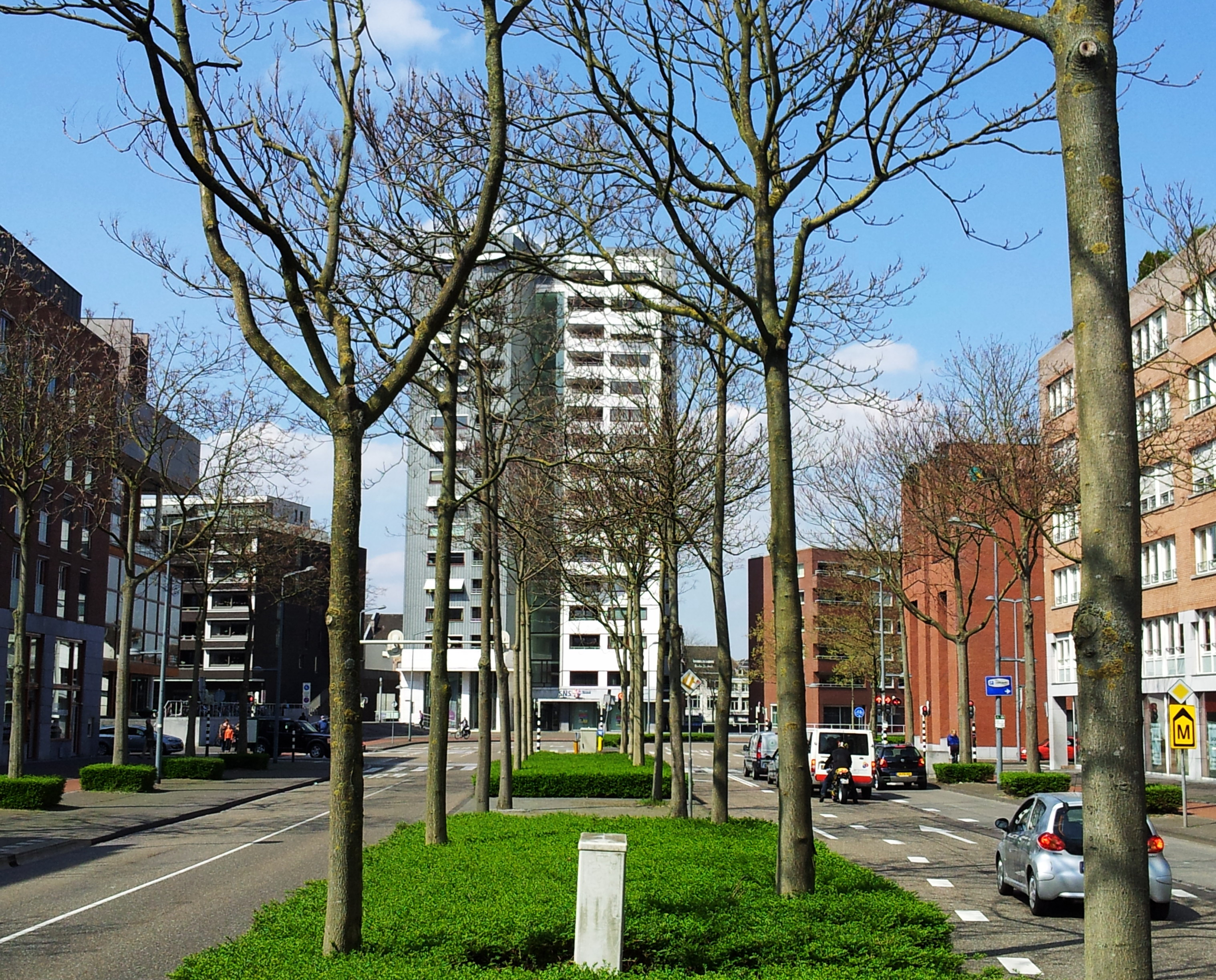
Céramique: view of Avenue Céramique into the opposite direction

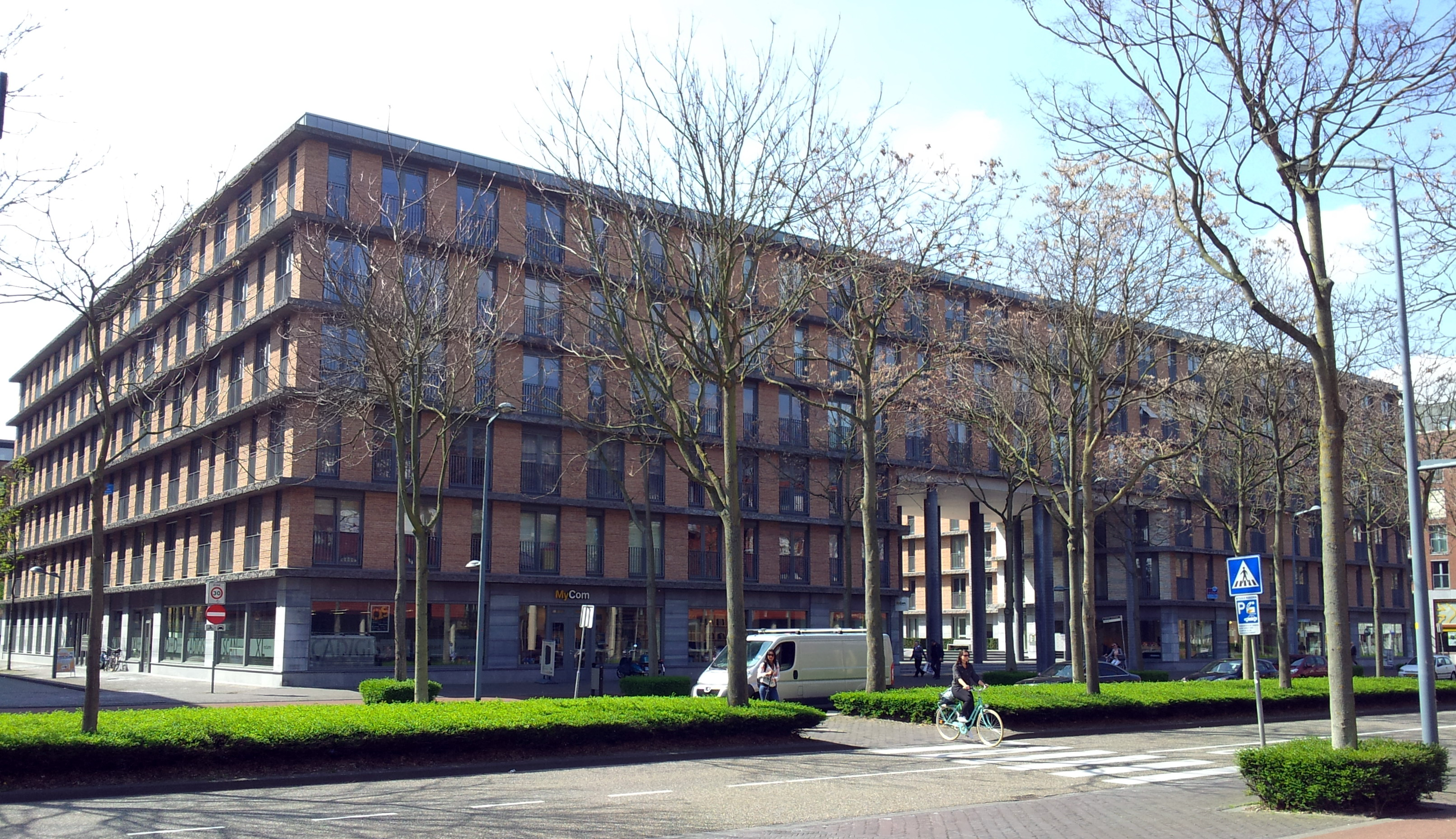
Céramique: view of an apartment building typical of this section of Wyck
