= Vrijthof =

Square in Maastricht, the Netherlands

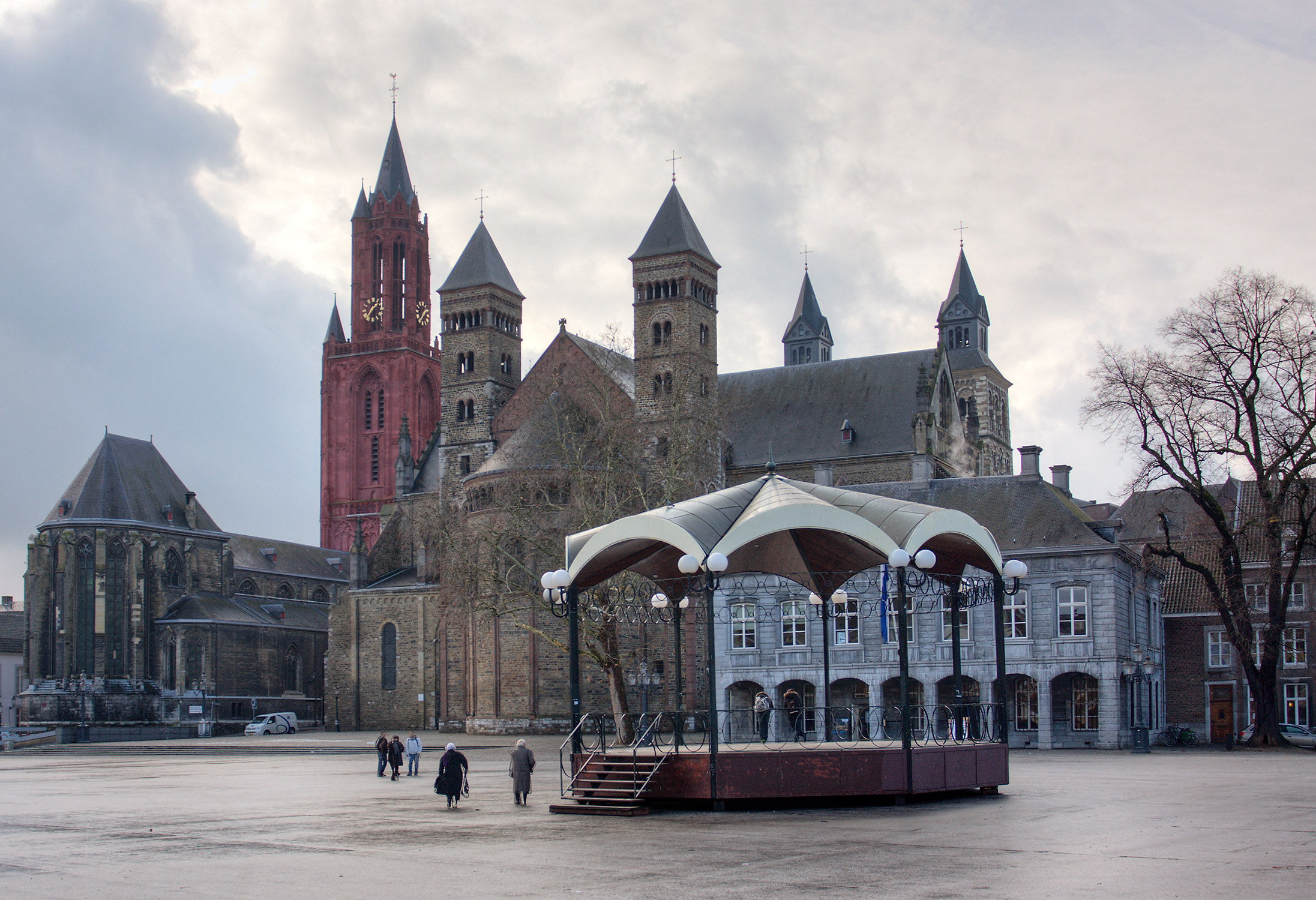
- Vrijthof with St John's (red tower), St Servatius and the Main Guard Building. In the centre the bandstand
- Interactive map of Vrijthof
- Type: town square
- Length: c. 160–190 m
- Width: c. 100–120 m
- Area: c. 1.5 ha
- Location: Maastricht, Netherlands
- Quarter: Binnenstad
- Coordinates: 50.849172°N 5.688419°E

Other
- Known for: 38 Rijksmonuments, pavement cafes, various events

Vrijthof is a large urban square in the centre of Maastricht, Netherlands. The square developed from an ancient Roman and Frankish cemetery into a semi-private space that belonged to the Collegiate Church of Saint Servatius. In the 19th century, it became the town's main square. It is surrounded by important heritage buildings, museums, a theatre, and a range of hotels, restaurants, and bars. The square is regularly used for public events.

== History ==
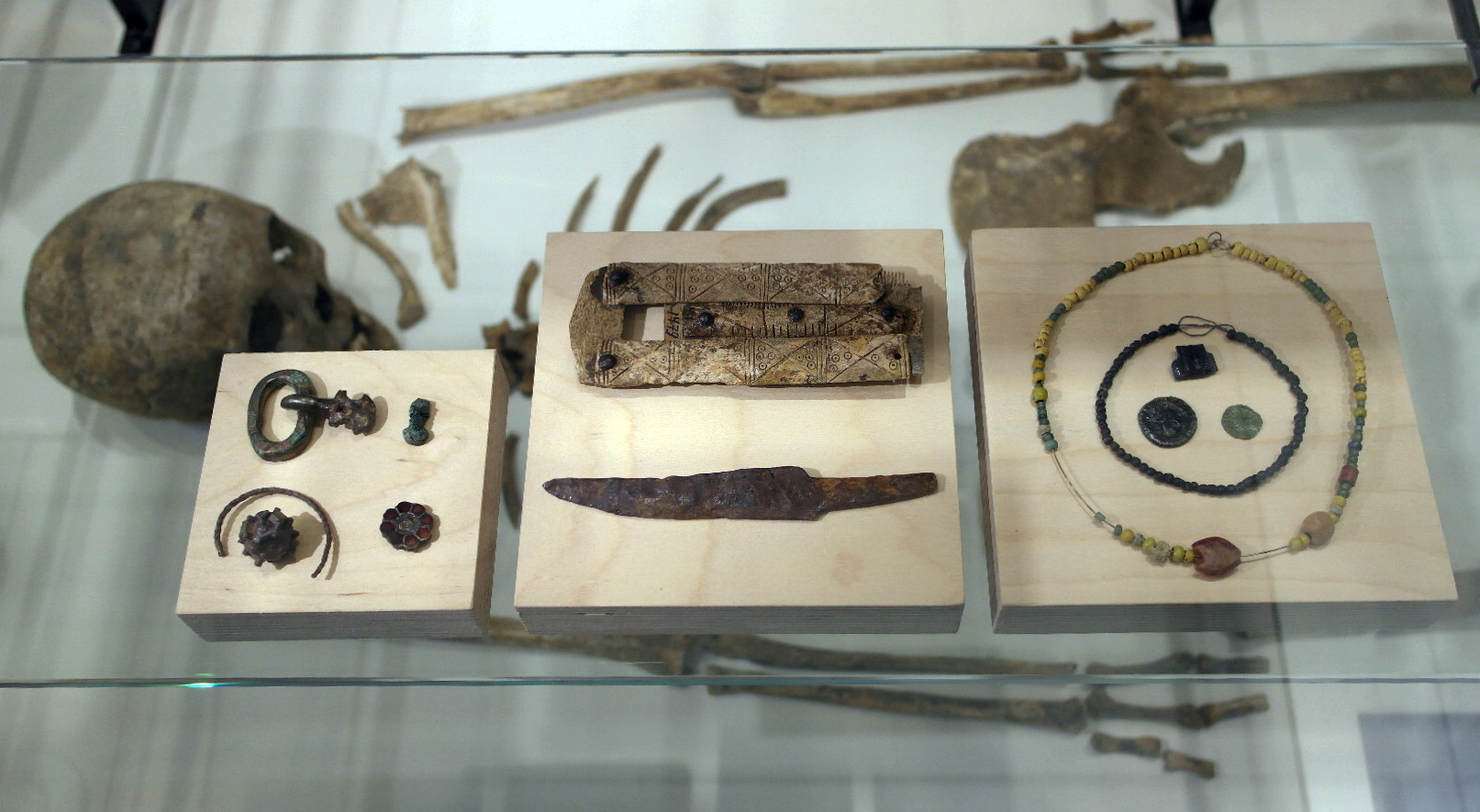
Contents of a grave of a Merovingian woman (Limburgs Museum, Venlo)

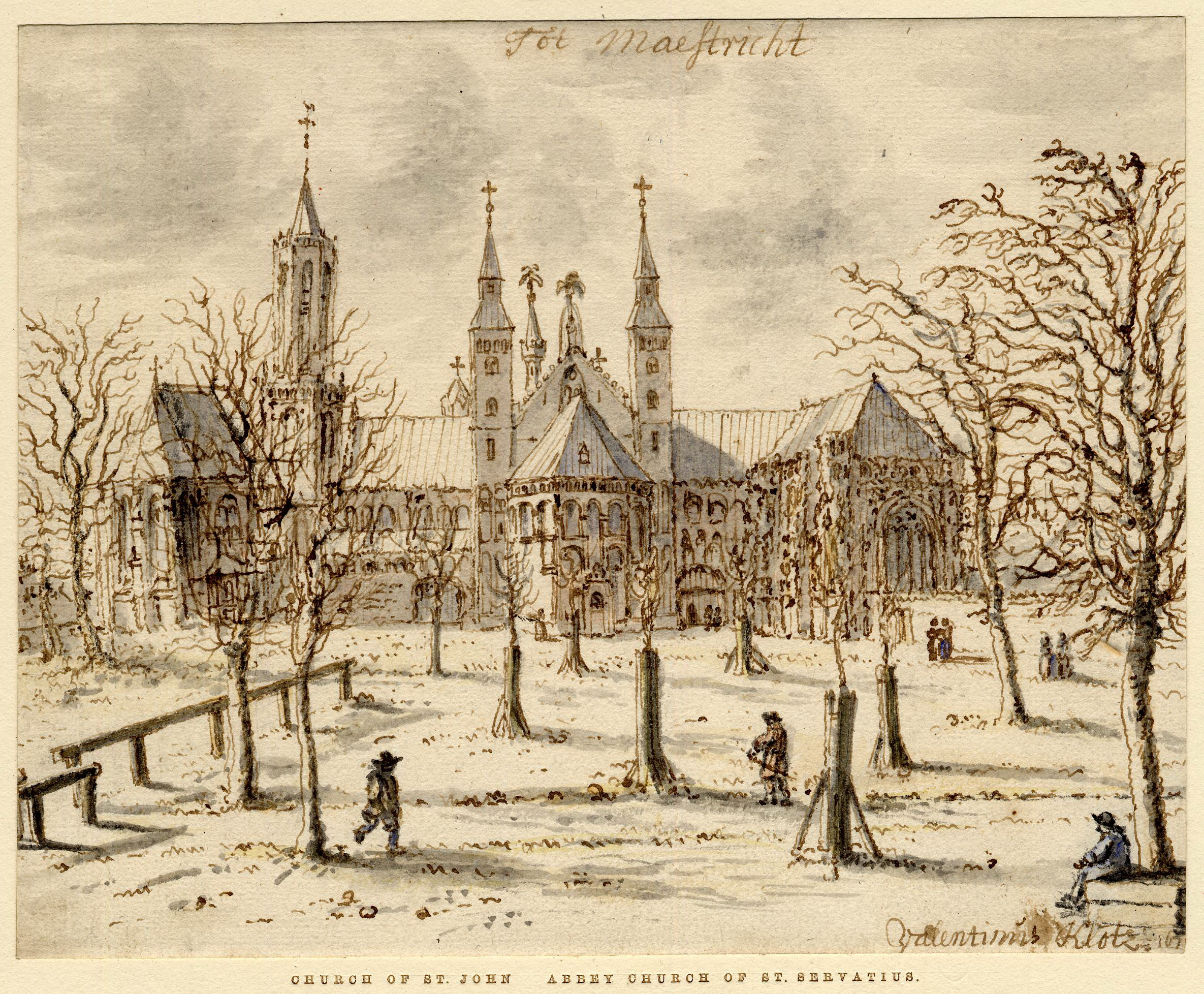
Vrijthof in the 1670s. Drawing by Valentin Klotz (British Museum)

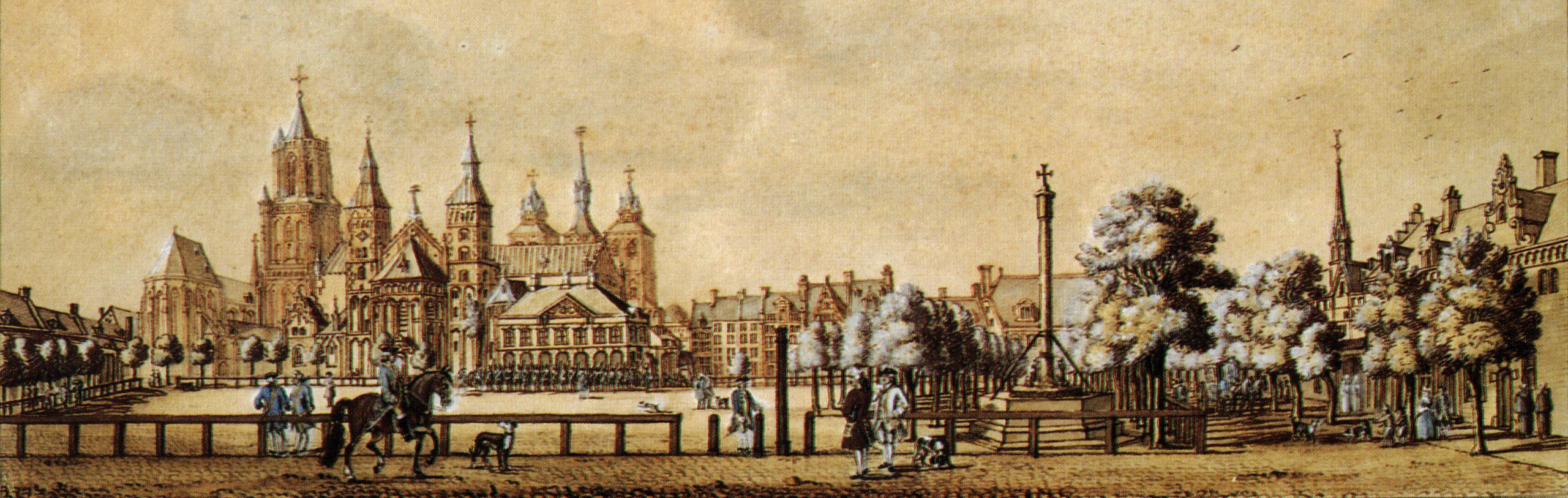
Vrijthof around 1750, possibly by Jan de Beijer

Archaeological excavations have shown that the area of the square was used as a burial site since the late Roman period. Several large cemeteries from the early Middle Ages were excavated in 1969–70, prior to the construction of an underground parking lot. The publication of the thousands of artifacts has only recently started. Further excavations on the north side of the square in 2003 revealed the remains of thirteen layers of the ancient Roman road, the so-called Via Belgica, an important route between Boulogne Sur Mer at the English Channel and the city of Cologne on the river Rhine.

The oldest written reference to the name Vrijthof dates from 1223, when Emperor Frederik II transferred the area to the chapter of Saint Servatius. After that, the square was walled, with iron entrance gates near the corners. During the two weeks of the Maastricht Septennial Pilgrimage, the walls were removed due to the large crowds that gathered there. The pilgrims gathered around the apse of Saint Servatius' where the relics of Saint Servatius and other saints were shown from the dwarf gallery. In the center of the square was the Fountain of Saint Servatius, which was provided with water from the Source of Saint Servatius in the valley of the Jeker, which was also popular with pilgrims. In the 15th century, a Gothic chapel was built as an extension of the northeast portal, the King's Chapel (Dutch: Koningskapel). Near this chapel was the Cemetery of the Poor (Dutch: Ellendigenkerkhof).

In the 14th and 15th centuries, there were a number of famous inns in Vrijthof, mainly situated near the northeast corner. This is also where in 1292 the original perron was erected, the symbol of the jurisdiction of the prince-bishop of Liège. Maastricht however was a condominium and had double jurisdiction. The symbol of the duke of Brabant (a scaffold!) stood near the northwest corner. At times, the square was used for public executions (before the new town hall was built at Markt). In 1408, after the suppression of a rebellion by prince-bishop John of Bavaria, one of the rebellious mayors of Liège was beheaded in the square. In 1485, William I de La Marck, known as the "Swine of the Ardennes", was executed in Vrijthof. In 1535, 15 heretics Anabaptists were burnt at the stake.

In the 17th and 18th centuries, the square was used as a parade ground for the garrison. At the end of the 17th century, the wall around Vrijthof was replaced by a fence. The Main Guard House was built in 1736. During the French Occupation (1794–1814), Vrijthof was renamed Place des Armes. Around the same time, the two almshouses in the south-east corner of the square, the Hospitium of St. Servatius and that of St. Jacob were demolished, as well as the Saint Maternus Chapel and the King's Chapel, and the Convent of the White Nuns.

A large parking garage was constructed from 1969 to 1972. Due to construction errors, it had to be rebuilt in 2003.

== Sightseeing ==
=== Heritage buildings ===
There are 38 listed buildings (rijksmonumenten) in Vrijthof, including the Romanesque Basilica of Saint Servatius (Dutch: Sint-Servaasbasiliek), the Gothic Church of Saint John (Sint-Janskerk), the largely 16th-century 'House of the Spanish Government' (Spaans Gouvernement), the 18th-century Military Guard House (Hoofdwacht) and the early 19th-century 'General's House' (Generaalshuis). Many houses date from the 18th or 19th century. Some of the larger houses in the square formerly belonged to canons of St Servatius. The modern bandstand dates from around 1970.

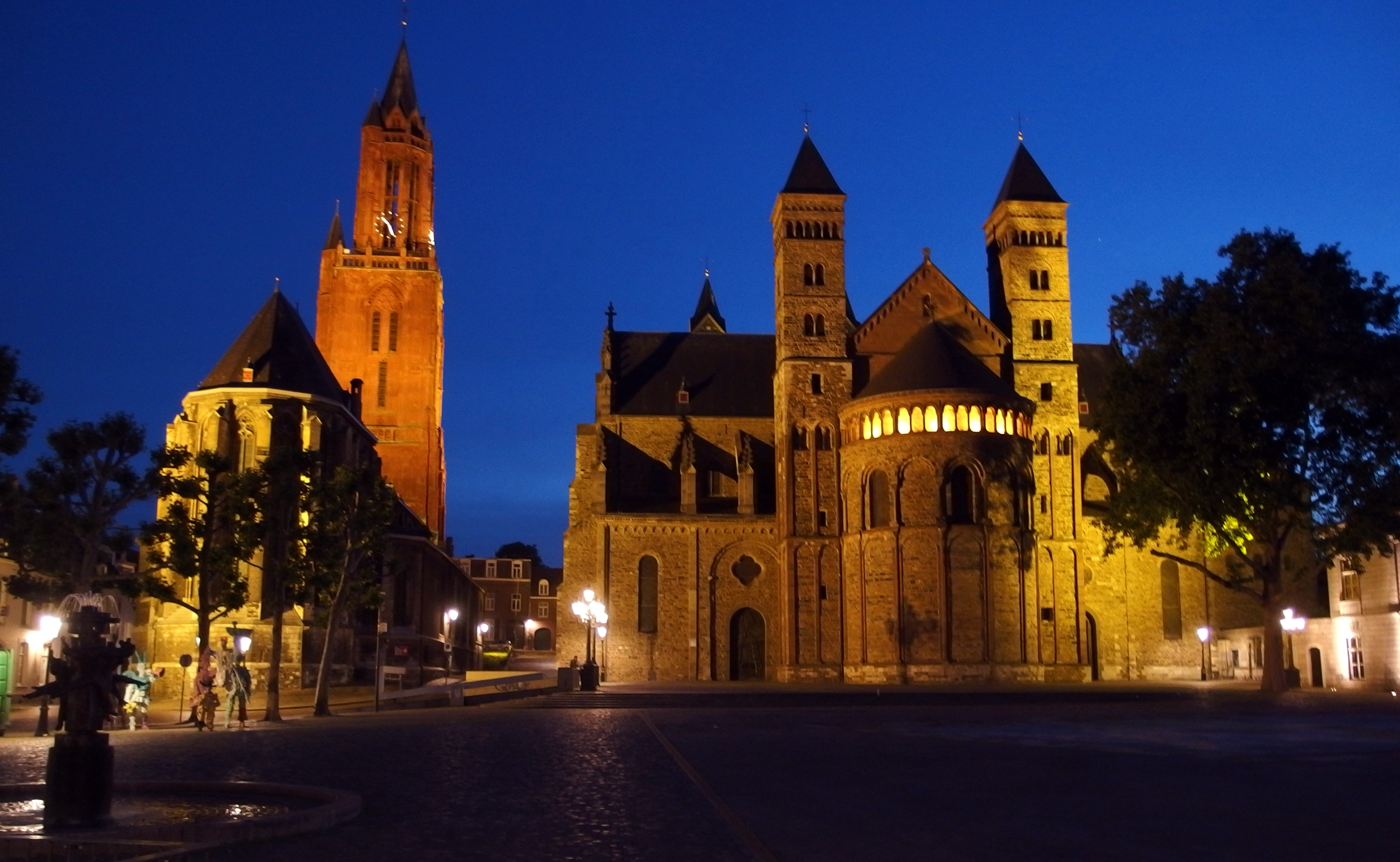
St John's and St Servatius'

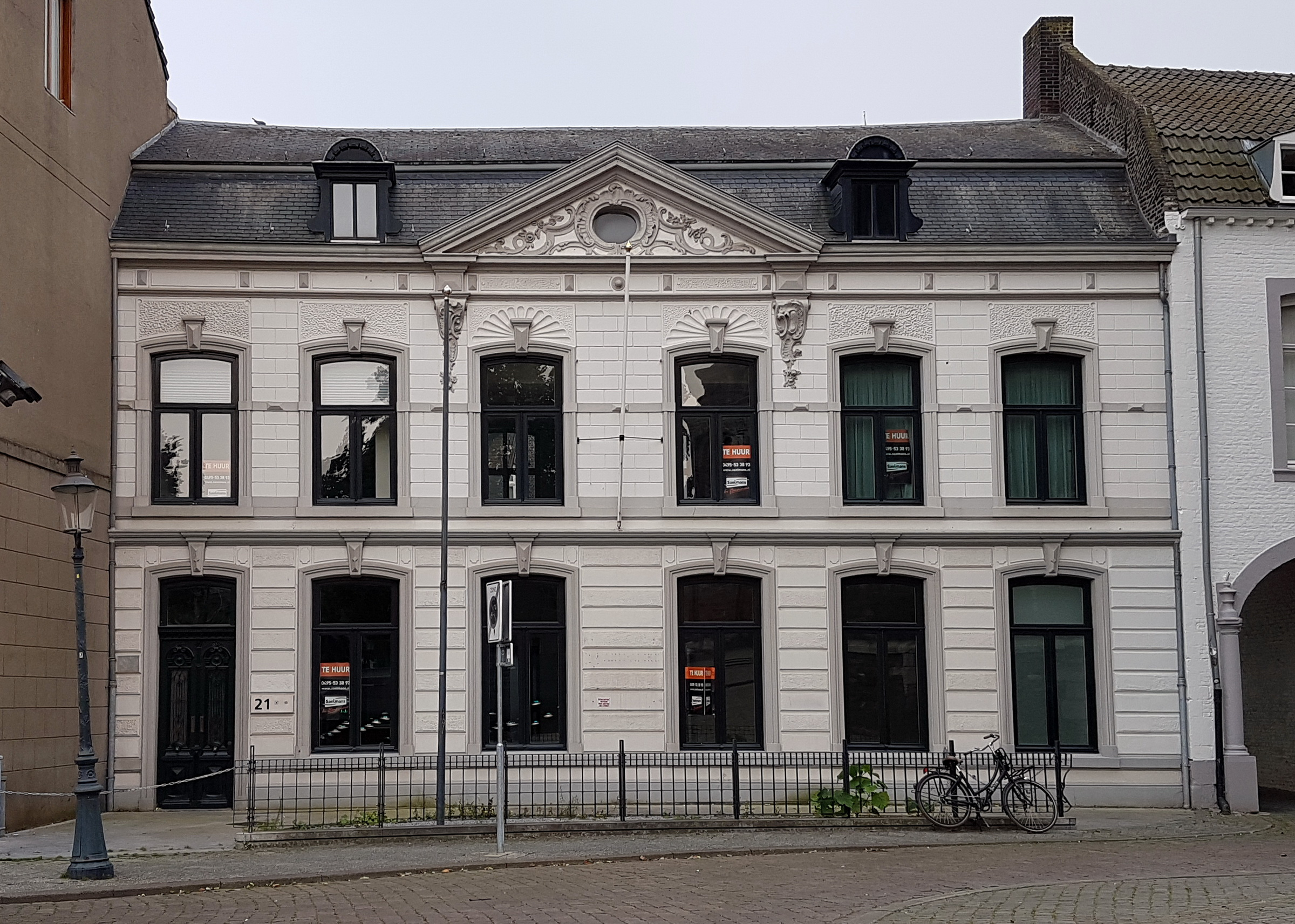
Former canon's house

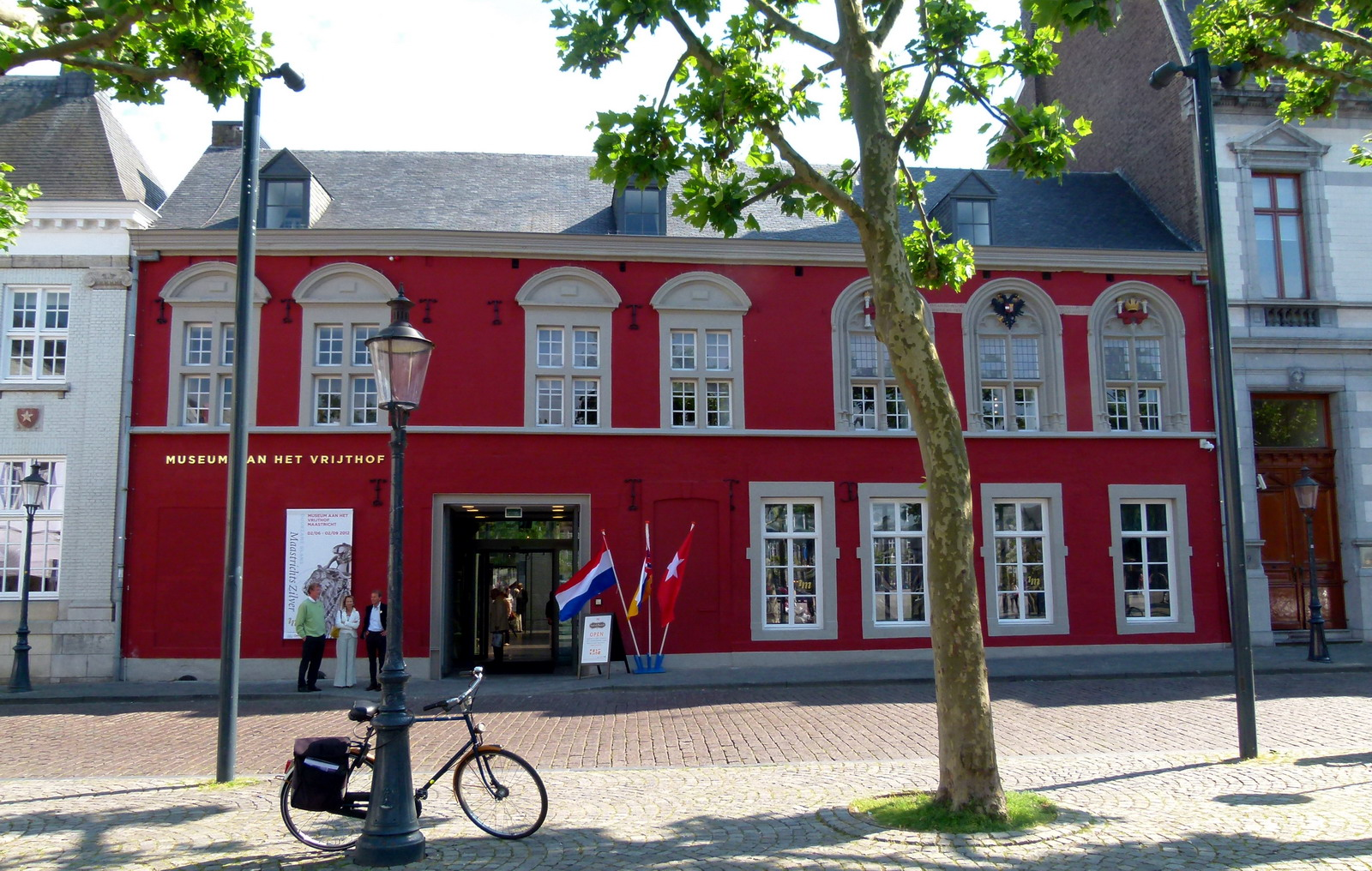
Spanish Government House

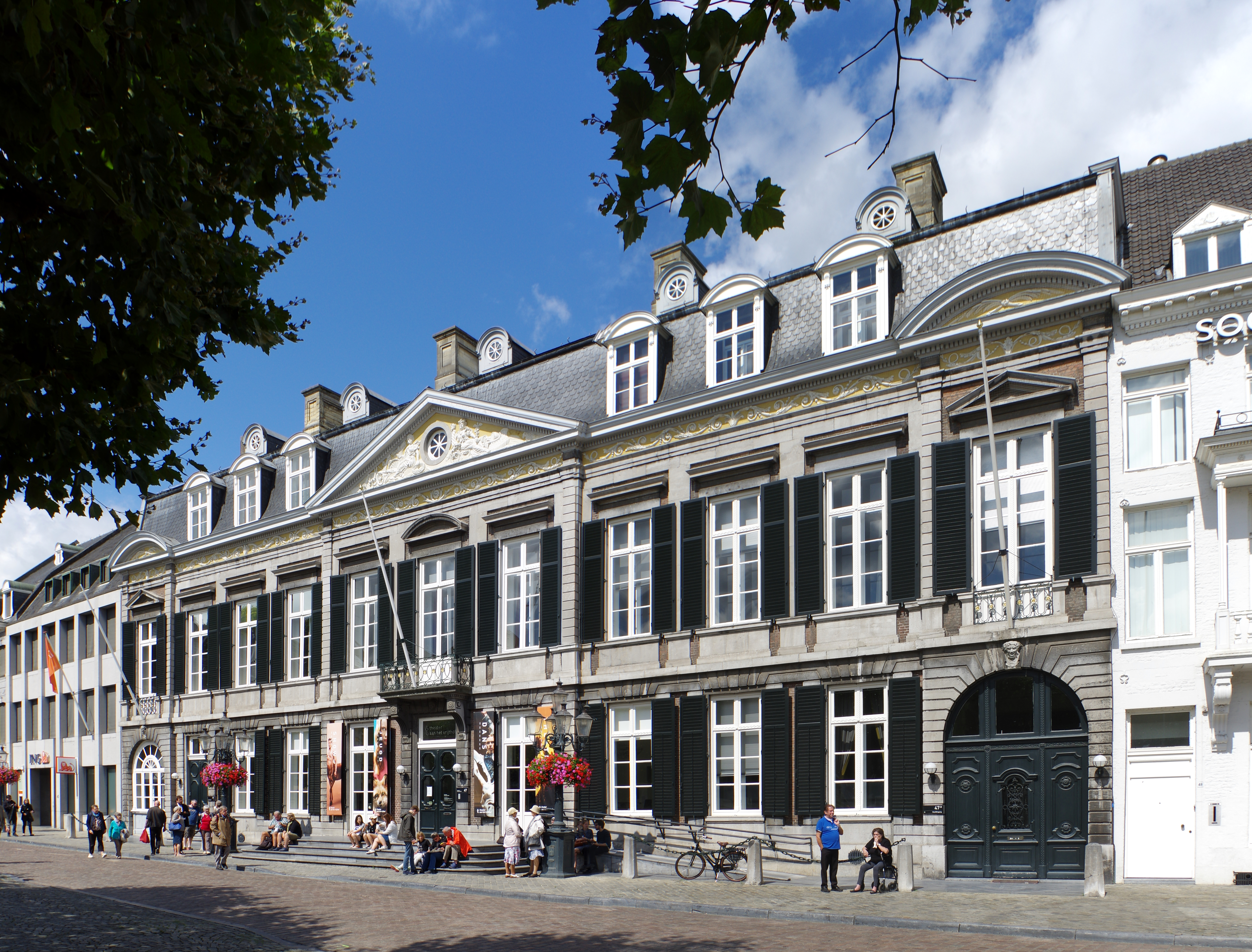
General's House

=== Museums ===
The Treasury of the Basilica of Saint Servatius is housed in an 11th-century chapel that overlooks Vrijthof Square. The Museum of Religious Art can only be accessed from the church's main entrance at Keizer Karelplein.

The Museum aan het Vrijthof is a small museum housed in the Spanish Government Building. It has a few period rooms and shows work from local artists, mainly of the 20th century.

=== Public art ===
The perron was the symbol of towns in the Prince-Bishopric of Liège. The original column was demolished by the French in 1795. The perron at the north-east corner of the square is a modern design of the 1950s by Jean Sondeyker and Jean Huysmans. Elsewhere in the square is a memorial plaque of the Old Hickory Division of the US Army, commemorating the Liberation of Maastricht in September 1944. Other public art works include a fountain named "Hawt uuch vas", designed by Frans Gast, and a group of statues called "'t Zaat Herremenieke" by Han van Wetering.

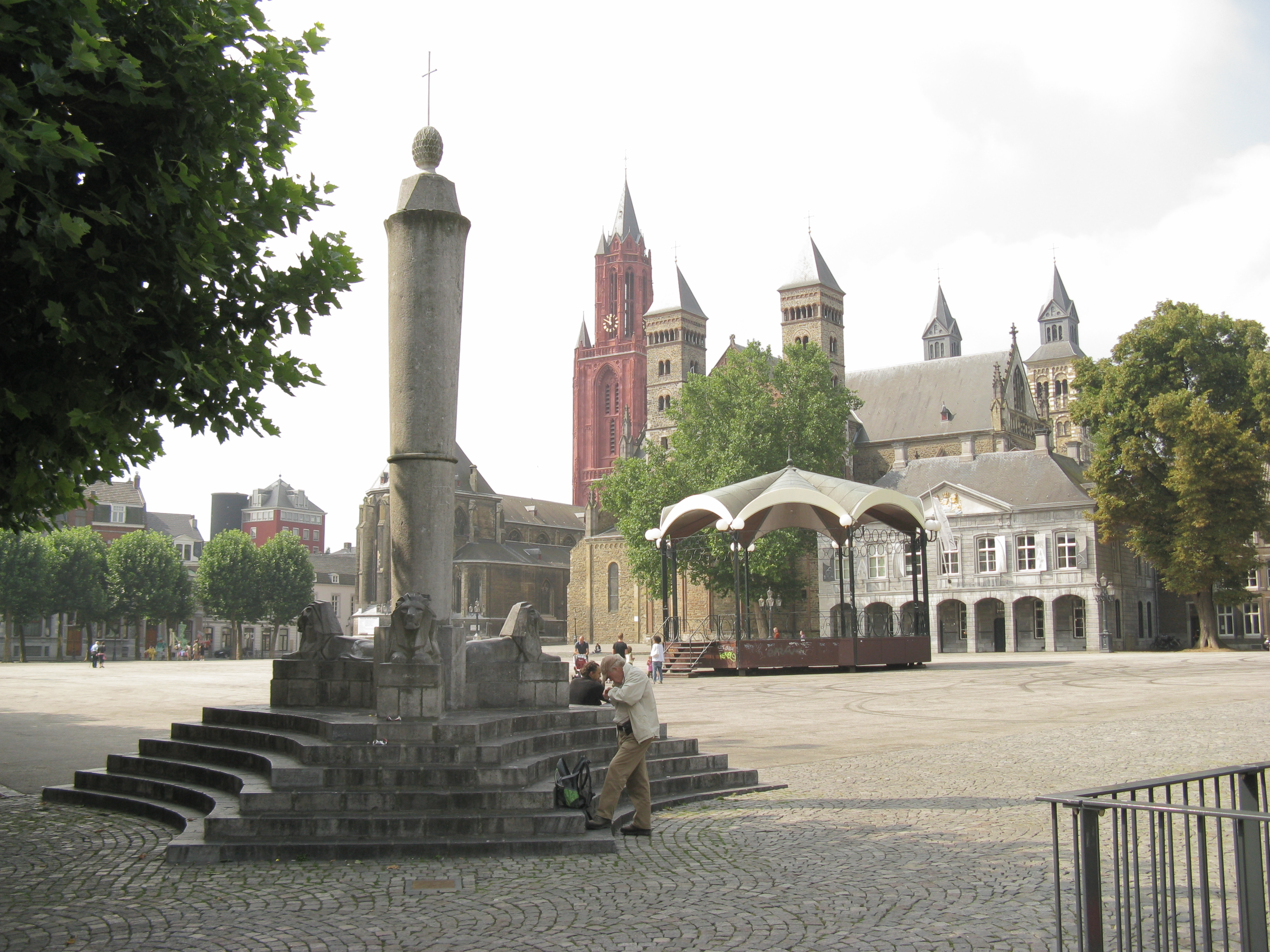
Perron and band stand

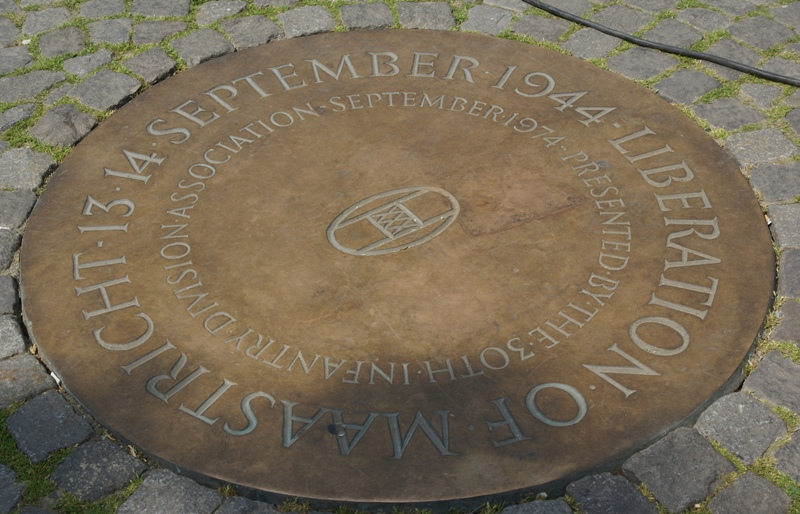
Plaque Old Hickory Division

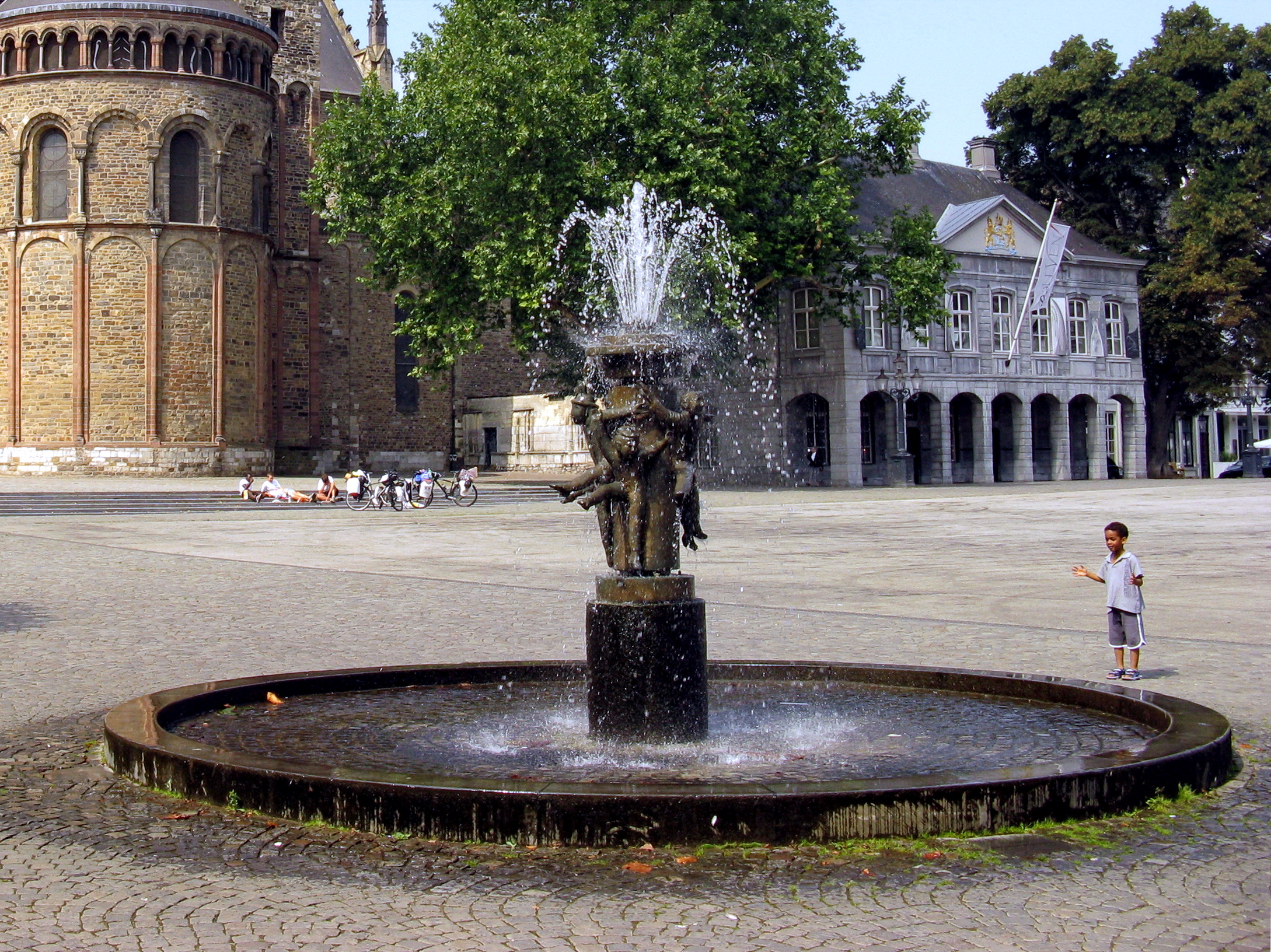
Fountain Hawt uuch vas

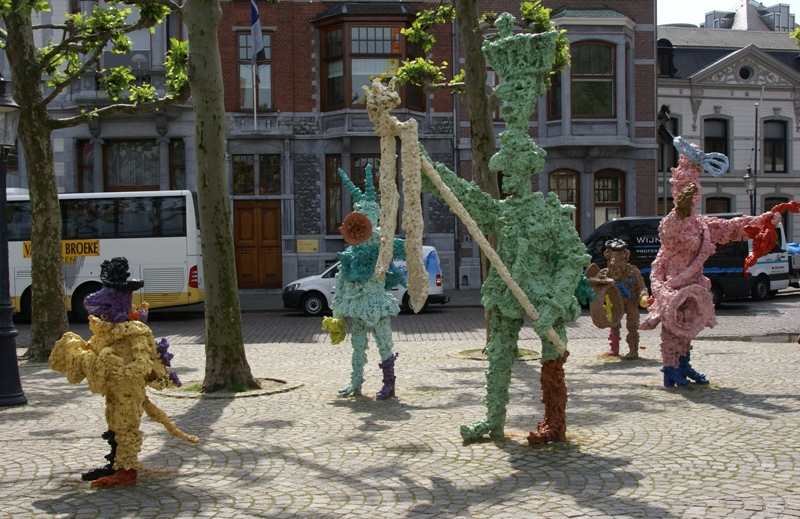
't Zaat Herremenieke

== Entertainment ==
=== Theatre ===
The 'Theater aan het Vrijthof' is the main theater in Maastricht. It was built around 1990, using as an entrance (as well as box office and foyers) the Neoclassical General's House. It is used both for concerts and theatre performances.

=== Hotels, bars, restaurants ===
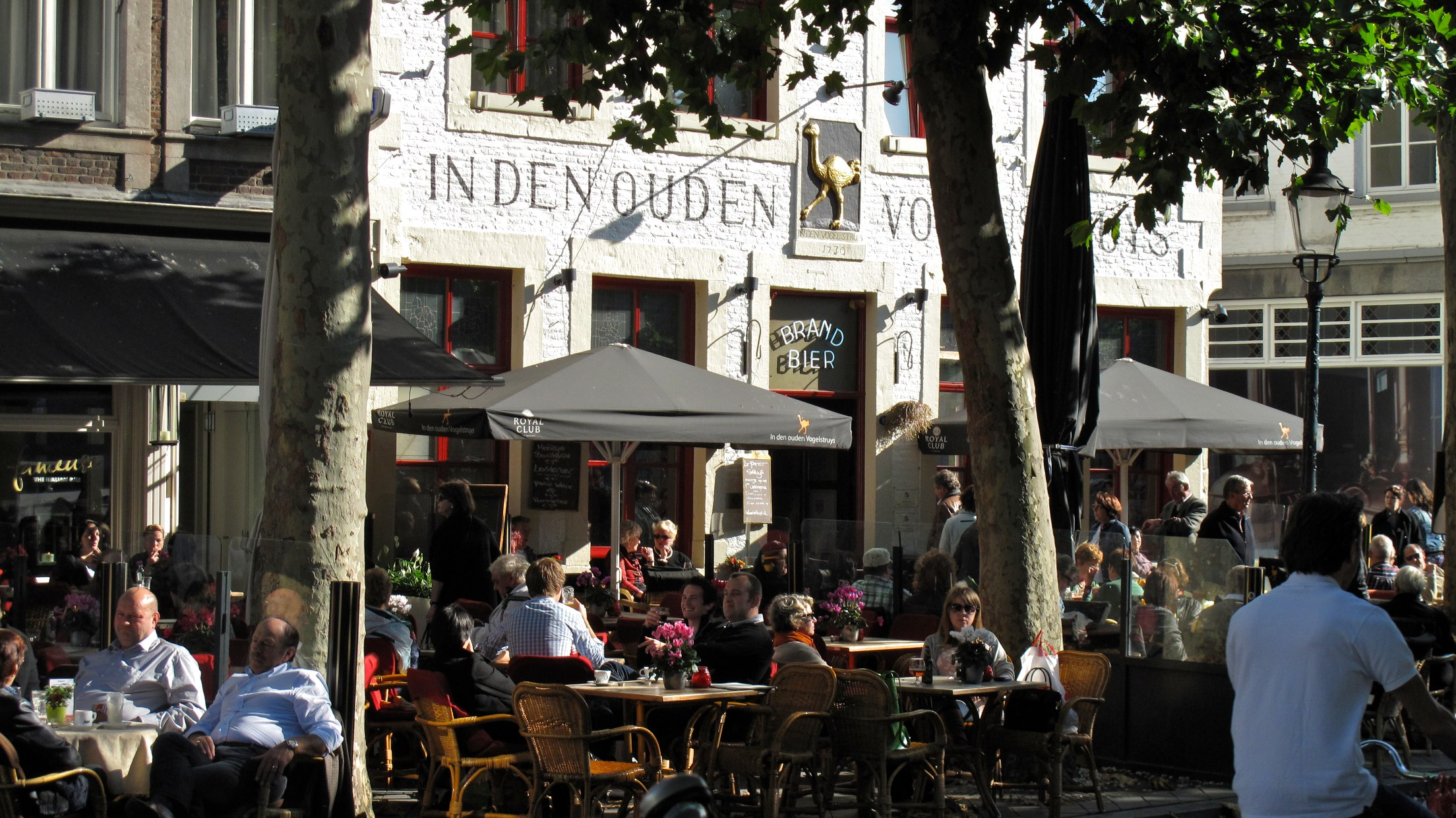
Sidewalk cafes in Vrijthof

Most of the cafés and restaurant are located on the east side of the square. A typical example of a traditional "brown cafe" (Dutch: bruin café) is 'In den Ouden Vogelstruys' on the corner of Platielstraat, reportedly the oldest café in the city (1730). All cafés and restaurants have sidewalk cafés overlooking the square.

On the north side of the square are three hotels. Hotel Du Casque has its origins in an old inn, 'In den Helm'. It was rebuilt in the 1930s in Art Deco. Recently, a short-stay accommodation opened in the former main post office, originally designed by Marinus Jan Granpré Molière in 1915, refurbished by Wiel Arets.

On the west side of the square is the building of the Groote Sociëteit, a former gentlemen's club (originally a military club) founded in 1760. On the east side is the Momus Building (1883), formerly a non-military club, now a regular café.

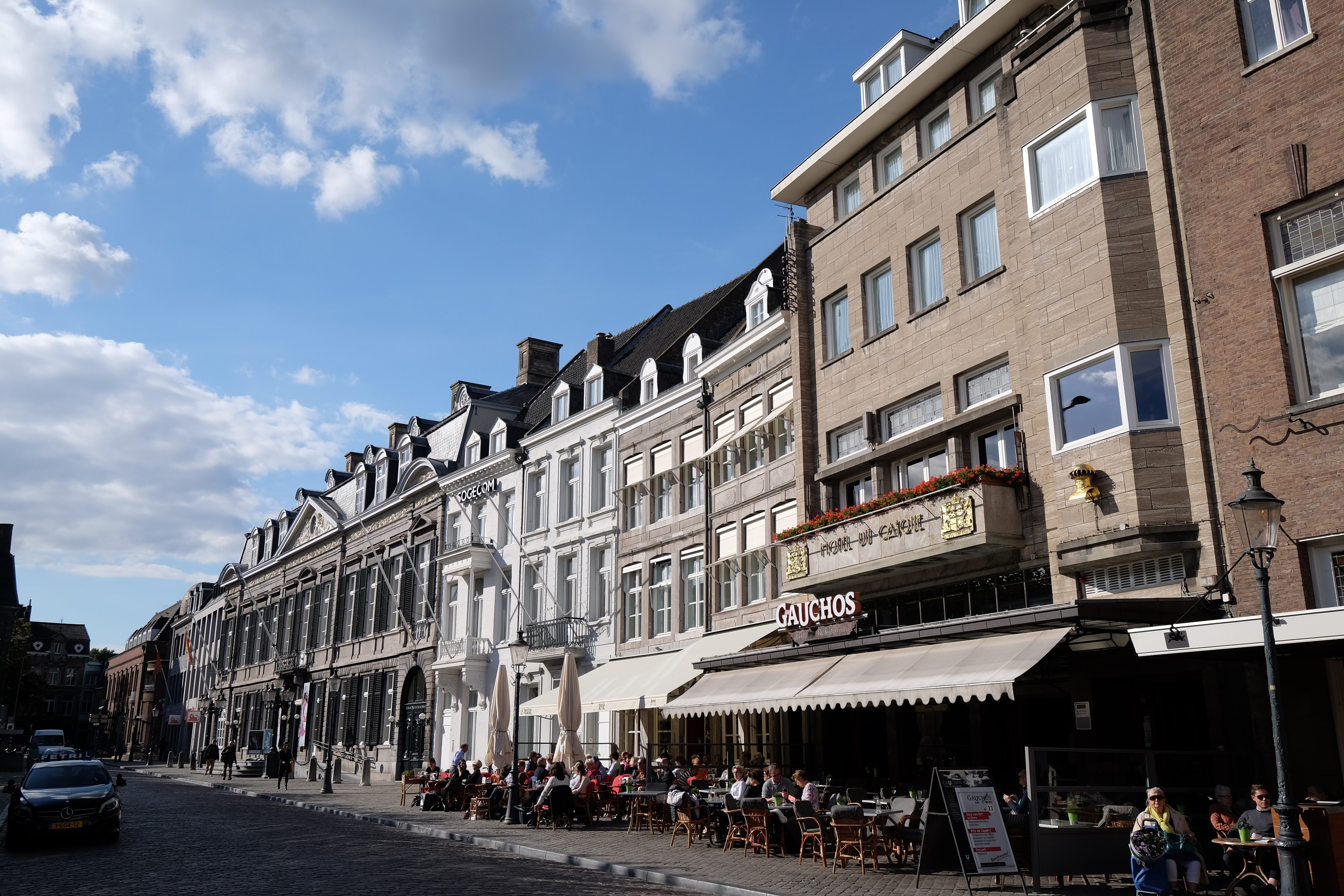
North side with hotel & theater

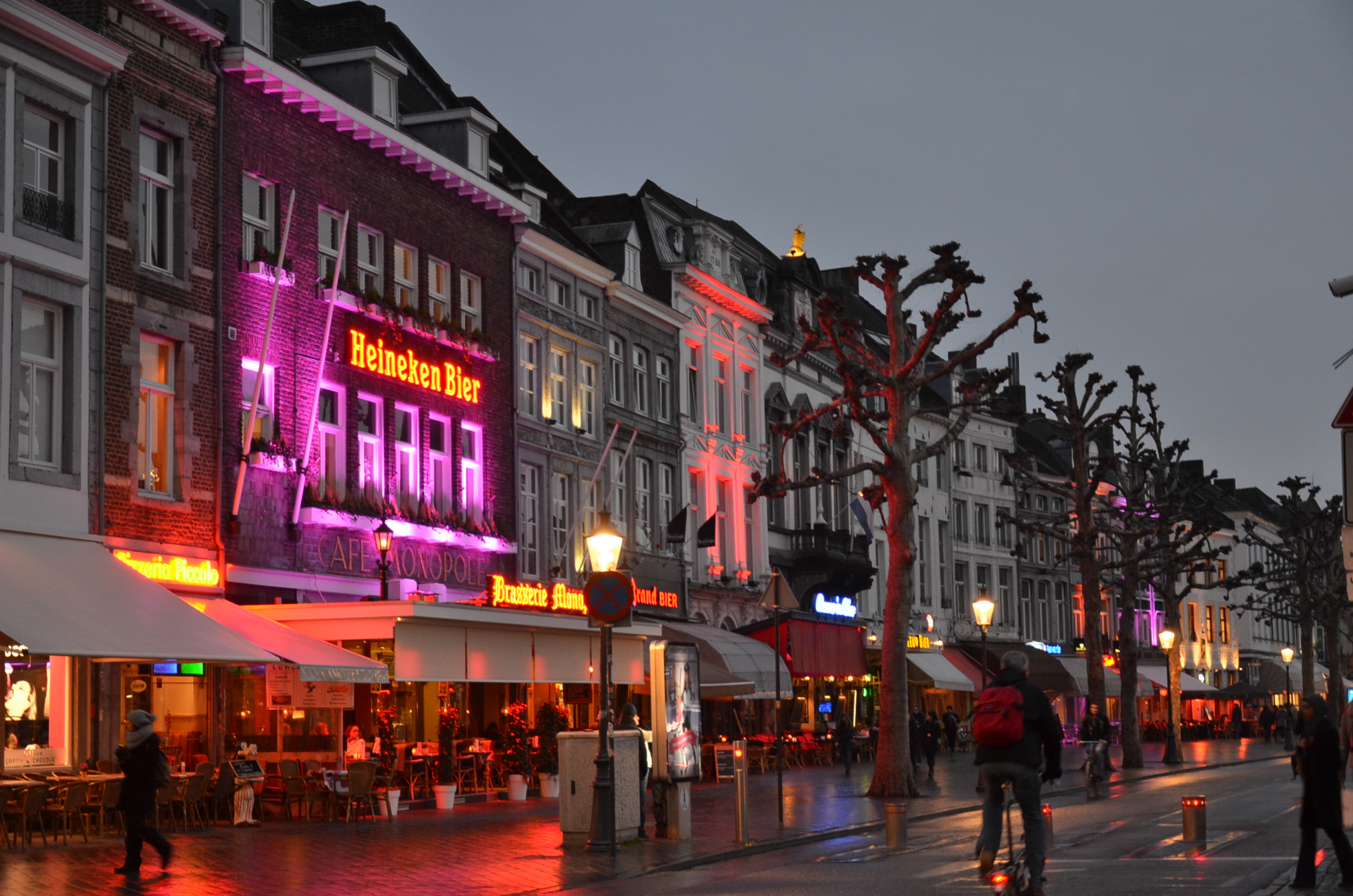
East side in Winter

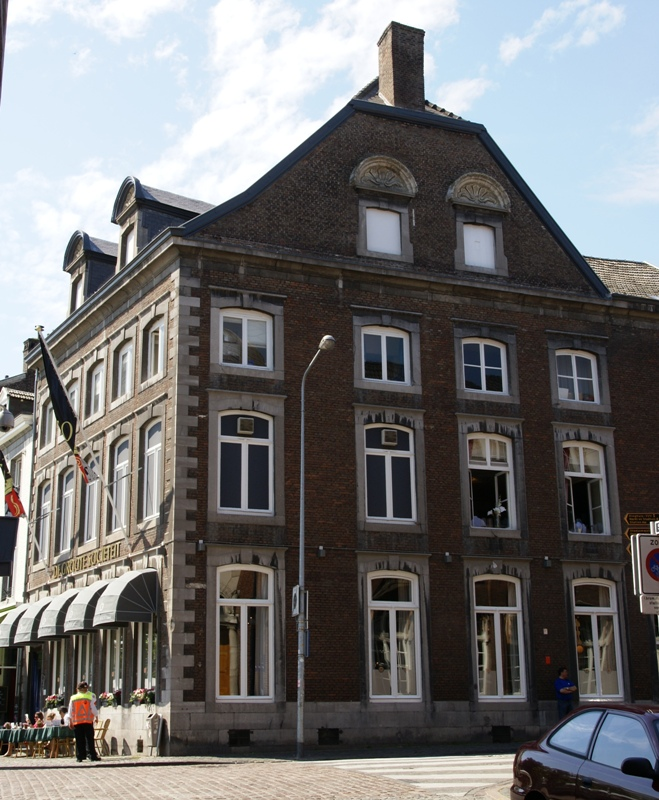
Groote Sociëteit

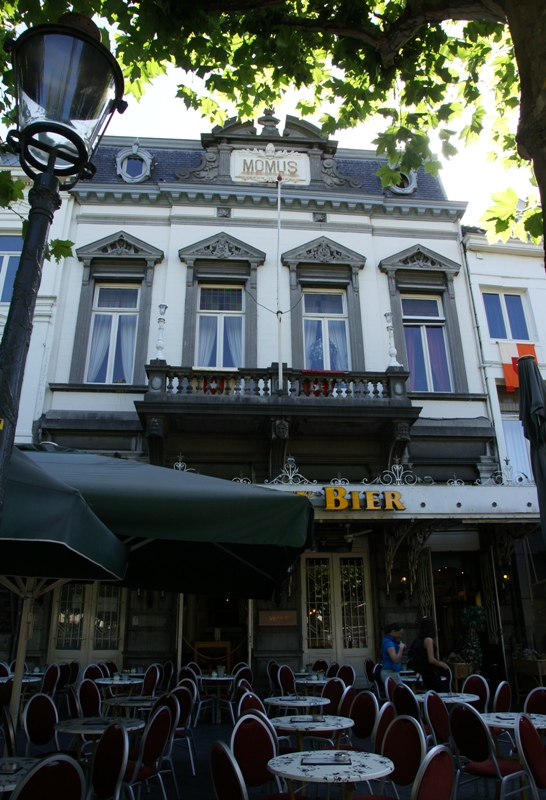
Sociëteit Momus

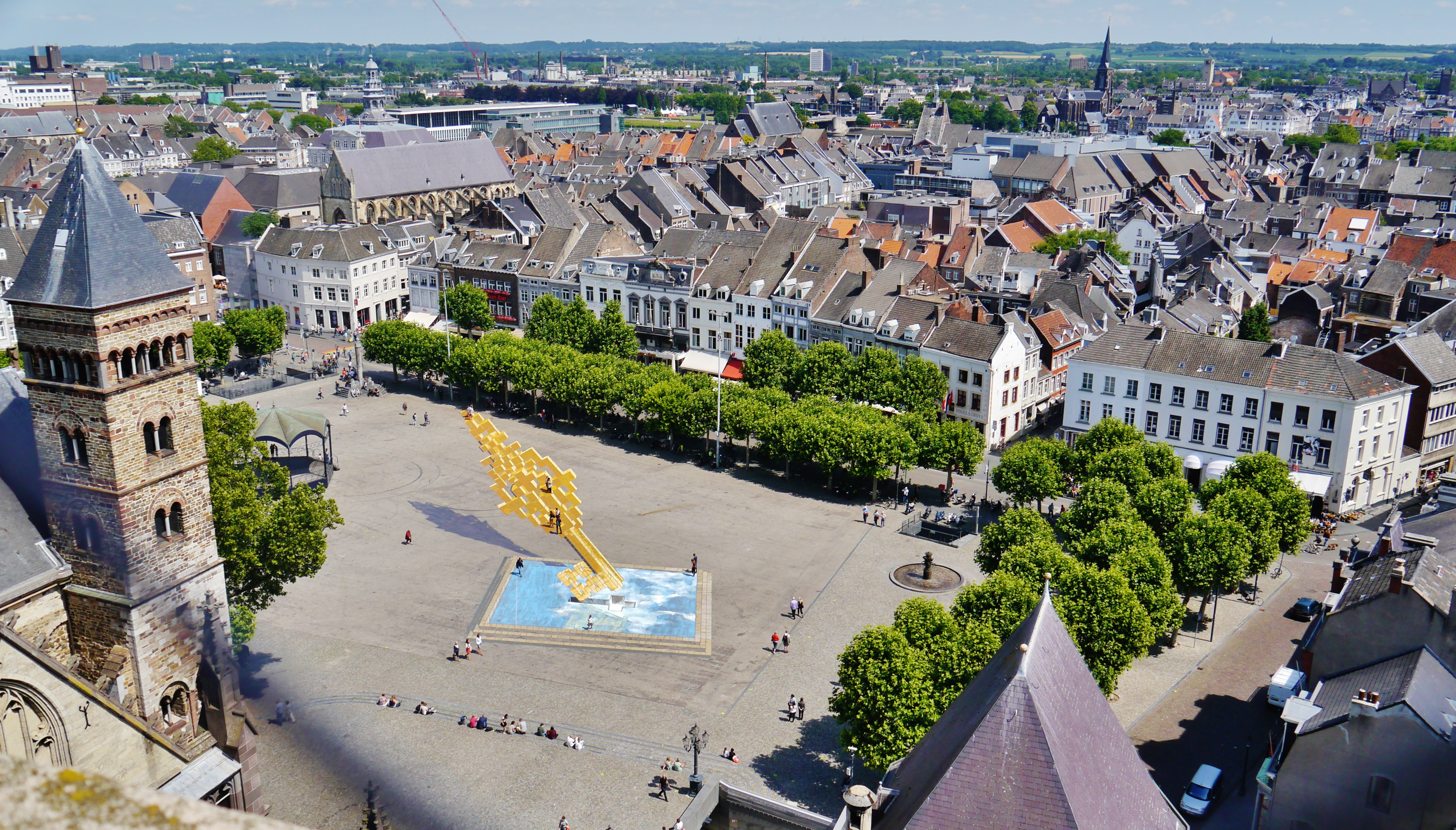
3D street painting of the Key of Saint Servatius, to be viewed from the tower of St John's

=== Events ===
Throughout the year, Vrijthof is used for all kinds of events. In December and January a popular Winter festival with an ice rink and a Christmas market is held. The square plays a central role in the Maastricht Street Carnival. During TEFAF Vrijthof becomes a temporary polo field. Around 13 May, the Feast of Saint Servatius, a funfair fills the square. During the seven-yearly Pilgrimage of the Relics the procession ends at Vrijthof where it can be watched from a spectator stand. In July and August open air concerts by André Rieu and his Johann Strauss Orchestra take place in the square.

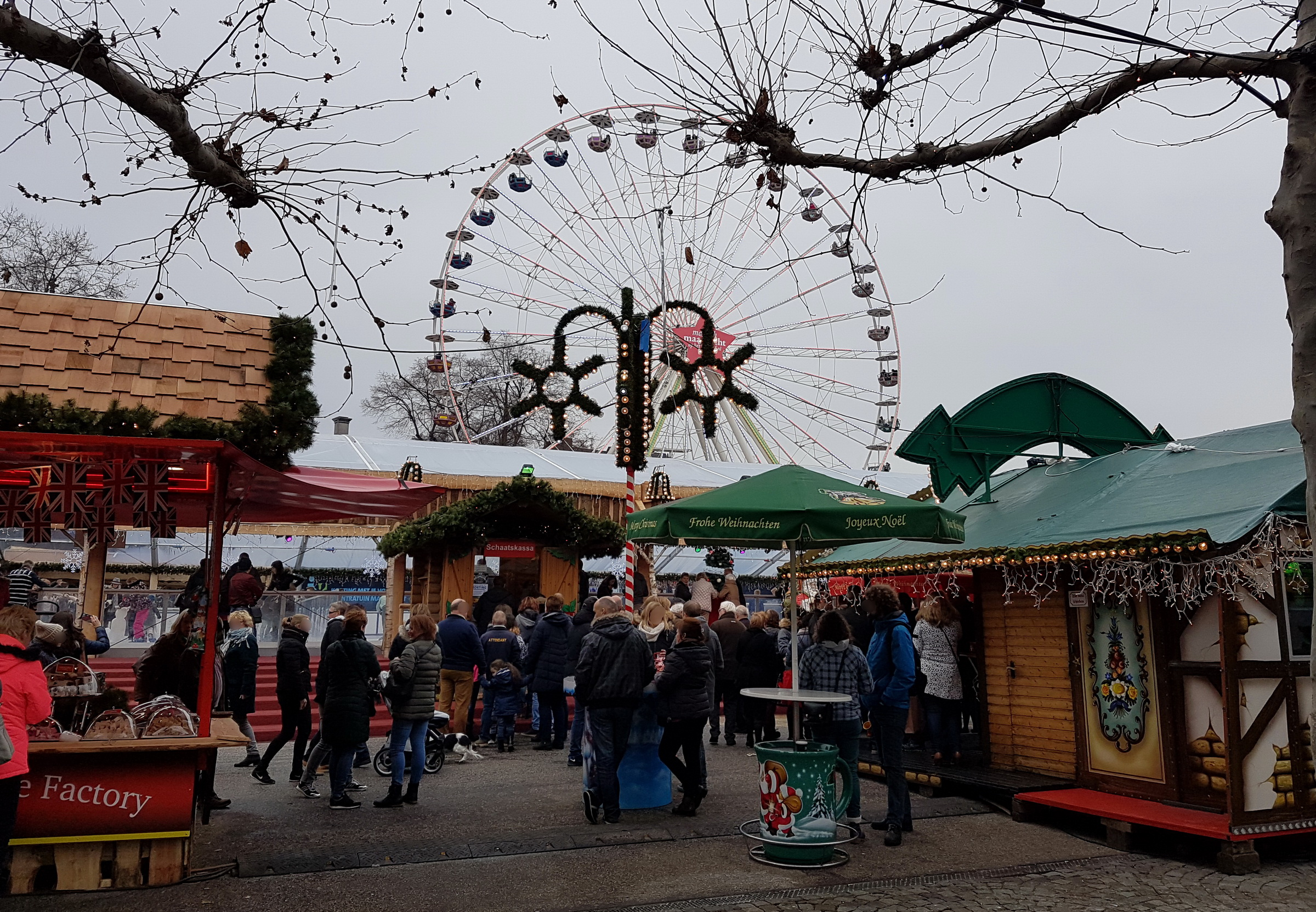
Christmas market, December 2016

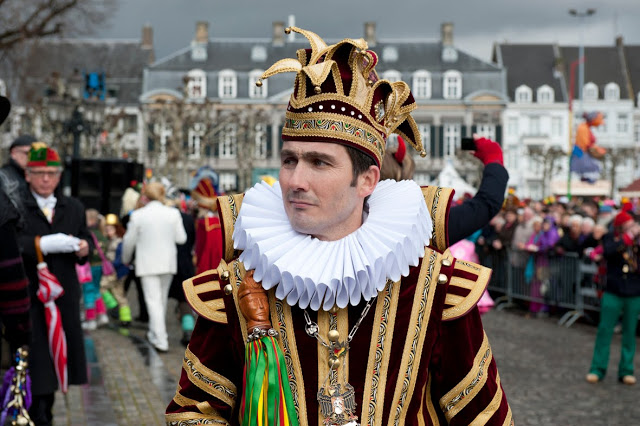
Street Carnival, February 2012

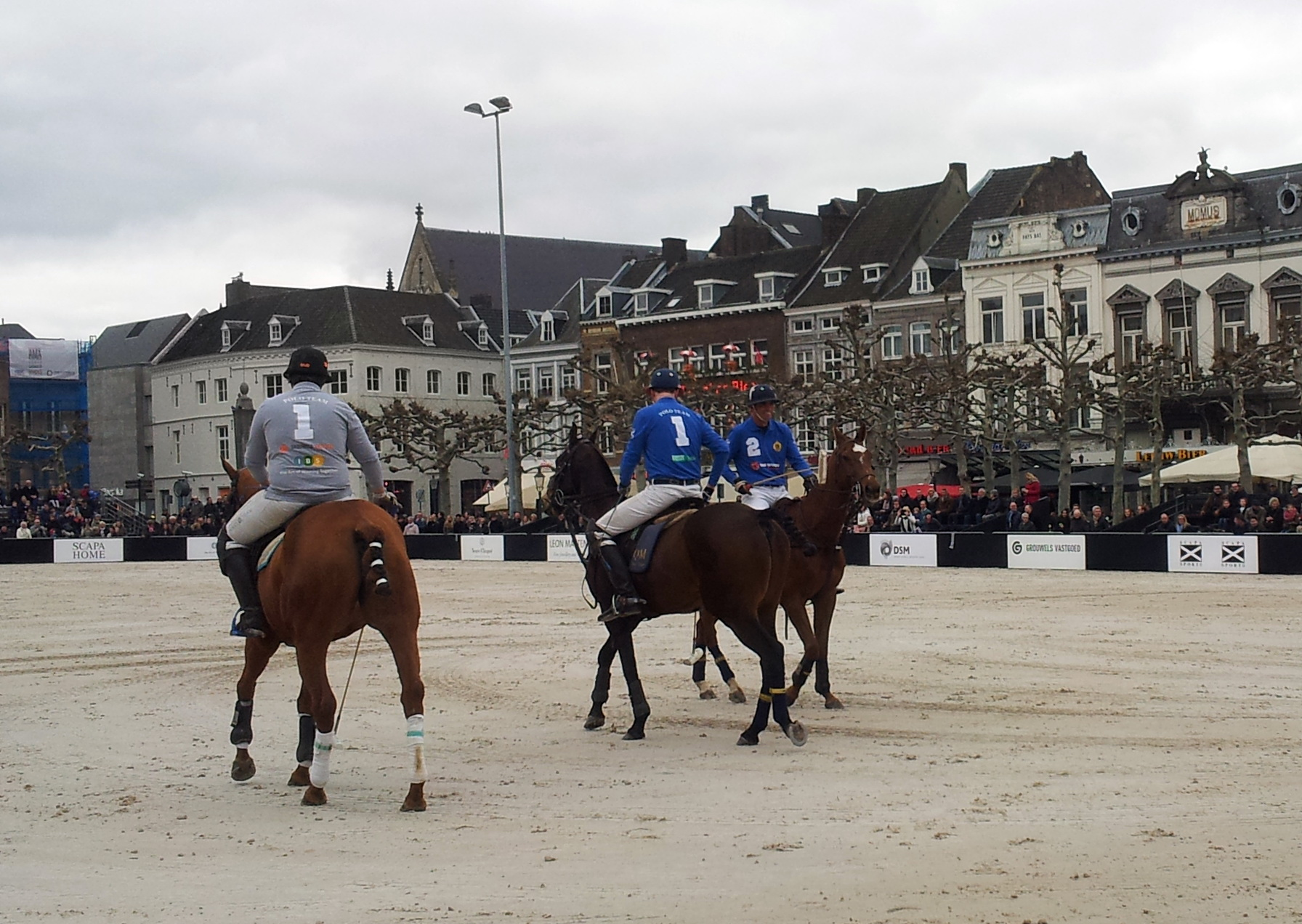
Polo game, March 2016

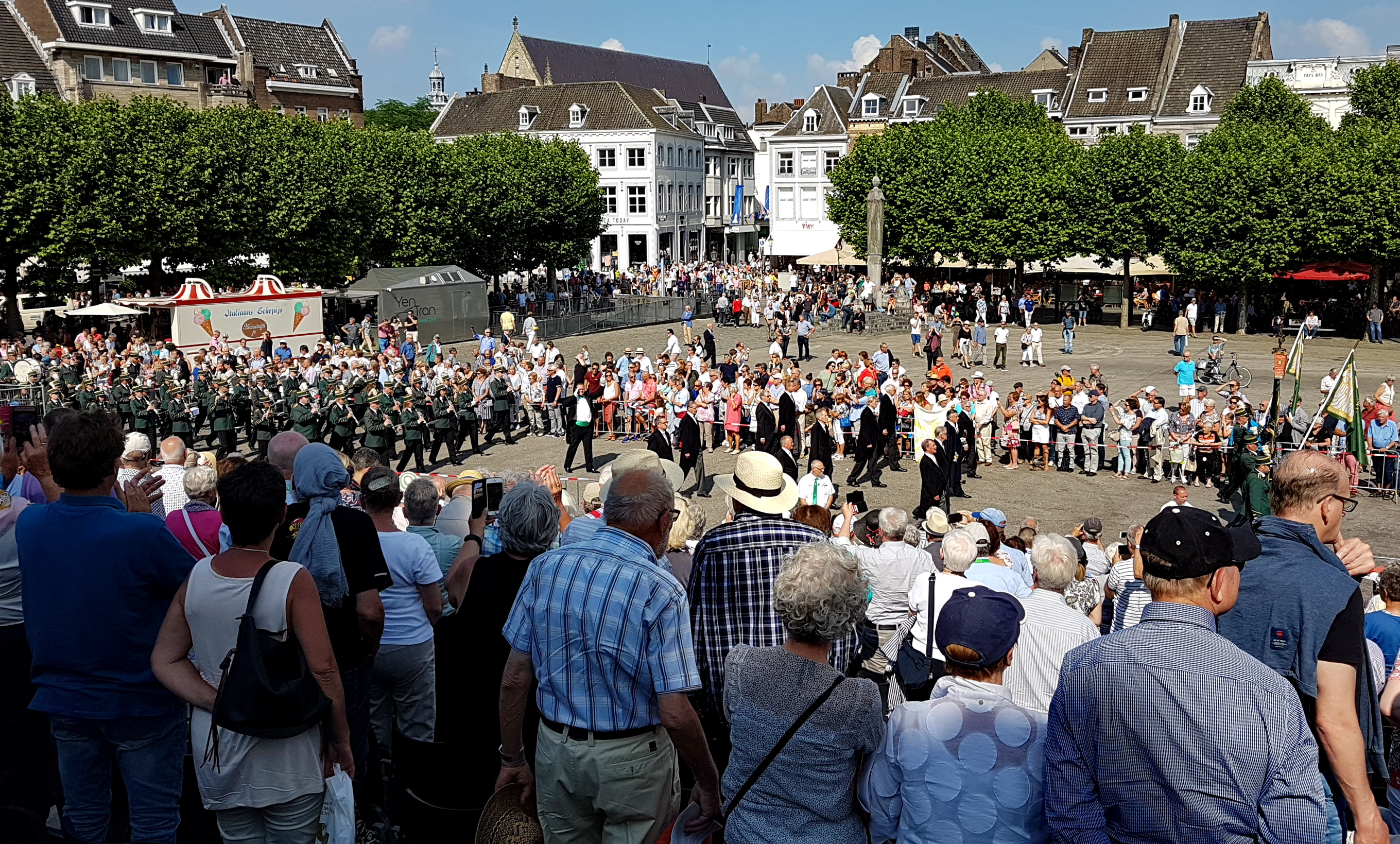
Septennial Relics Pilgrimage, June 2018
