= Saint John Church (Maastricht) =

Gothic church in the center of Maastricht, Netherlands

Sint-Janskerk
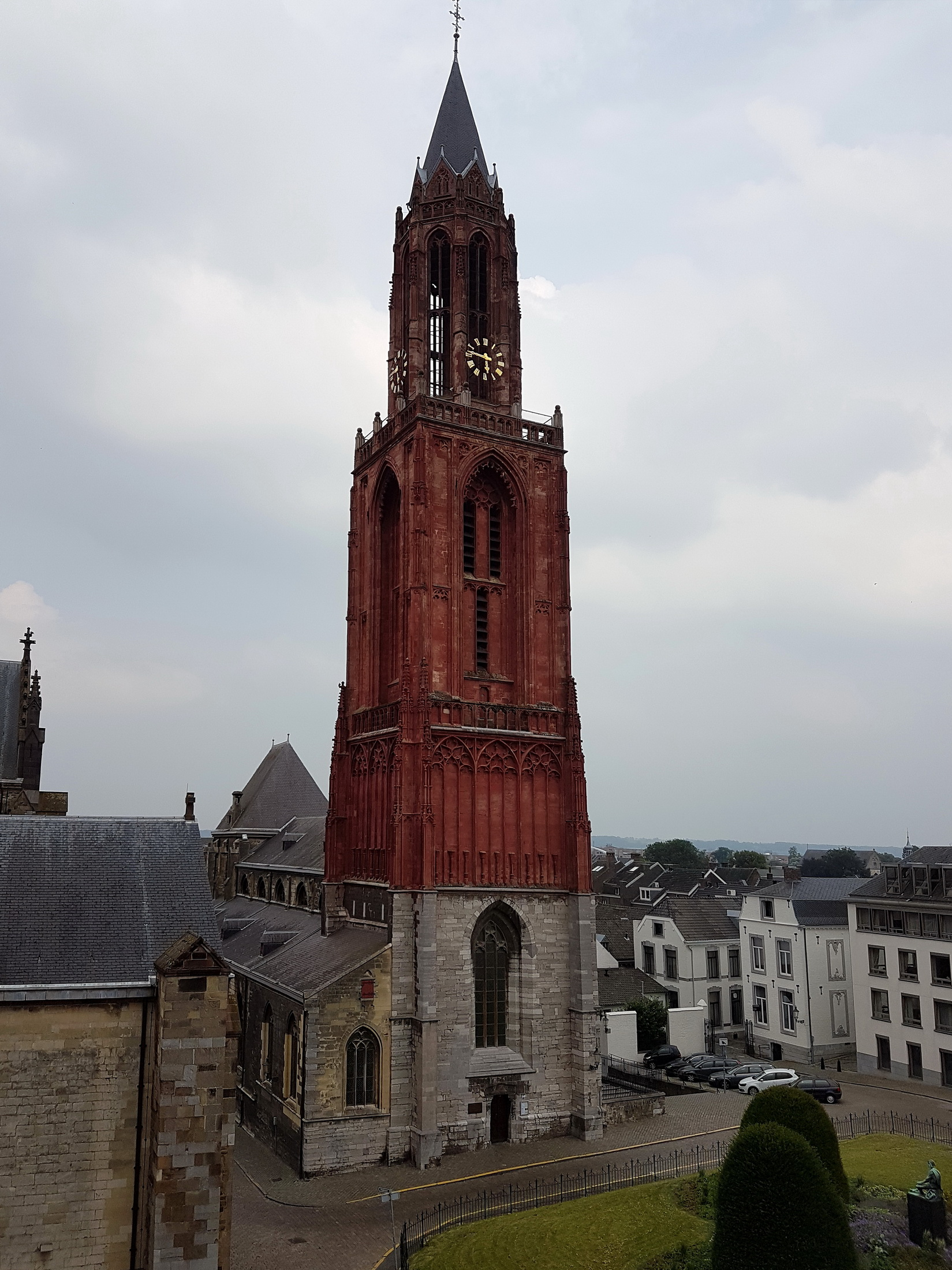
- St. John's church viewed from across the Henric van Veldekeplein

Religion
- Affiliation: Dutch Reformed Church

Location
- Location: Maastricht, Netherlands
- Municipality: Maastricht
- Interactive map of Sint-Janskerk
- Coordinates: 50°50′55″N 5°41′14″E

Architecture
- Style: Gothic architecture

The Sint-Janskerk (Saint John Church) is a Gothic church in the center of Maastricht, Netherlands. The Protestant Sint-Jan is situated next to the Roman Catholic Basilica of Saint Servatius on the town's main square, Vrijthof.

== History ==
The Church of Saint John was one of the four parish churches of Maastricht in the Middle Ages. (Note: Of Maastricht's four historic parish churches, only two remain: the St. John's Church and the Saint Matthew's Church; the Saint Nicholas' Church and the Saint Martin's Church were demolished in the 19th century.) The church was named after John the Baptist and was founded around 1200 by the Chapter of Saint Servatius to function as a baptismal and parish church for the parish of Saint Servatius. This relieved the load on the Saint Servatius Church and allowed it to function exclusively as a collegiate and pilgrimage church. On Easter and Pentecost eves, the canons of Saint Servatius went in procession to Saint John to consecrate the baptismal water. On that occasion, the church choir sang to the canons from the first tower transept of St. John's. The Sint-Janskerk was first mentioned in 1218. The current church dates from the 14th and early 15th centuries. In 1414 the Gothic baptistery was added. The original tower collapsed on June 8, 1366, after a violent storm. The current tower was completed in the second half of the fifteenth century with the construction of the roof lantern, after a long period of restoration.

=== Protestant church ===
After the conquest of Maastricht by Frederik Hendrik in 1632, the church passed into Protestant hands, after having been claimed by the Protestants for a short time. The church belongs to the Dutch Reformed Church since 1633. The former sacristy was repurposed as a vestry, and the wall paintings with Catholic scenes we covered by a layer of whitewash, only to be uncovered during restoration works at the beginning of the 20th century.

The Church of St. Servatius remained Catholic after 1632. The relationship between the Protestant and Catholic neighbors was not always harmonious. In the 17th century the Session of Sint-Jan complained about "wolf dancing", the wild beating of the bells of the Sint-Servatius to disrupt the sermon in the Sint-Jan. In 1659 a dispute arose between the Session and ivory carver Johannes Boissier about the marble tomb that he had made for Margarita Elisabet Cabeliaeu-de Gryse, the wife of Jacob Cabeliaeu. The Session found the monument, on which both spouses would be depicted as figures, was too Catholic. (Note: The statues were reminiscent of the Catholic images of saints and of the worship of saints. The misunderstanding that had helped cause a wave of Beeldenstorm.)

=== Restoration ===
The tower has not always painted with the current distinctive red color; writings mention the colors yellow (early 18th century) and white (early 19th century). The church was restored several times: in 1713 (by city architect Gilles Doyen), then in 1774 when the tower was restored and painted red), ca. 1800 the interior was whitewashed, in 1822 the tower was restored and painted red, and in 1843-44 the nave was restored. In 1877–1885 Pierre Cuypers led major restoration that including the tower roof, and in 1909–1912 by the architect Willem Sprenger who bricked up the Vrijthof gate, and restored the baptister. In 1967 and finally in the period 1981–1985, the church was restored again under the direction of Waalko Dingemans. During this latest restoration, the tower was repainted red in 1983. (Note: Approval for painting the tower was obtained from the relevant minister because of the Monuments Act. However, the municipality of Maastricht refused to grant permission, believing that the beauty of the city would be affected. People had become so used to the grayish yellow color of the tower that a red tower could hardly be imagined. The Council of State ruled that the municipality had no authority to stop the painting of the tower.)
