= KunstTour =

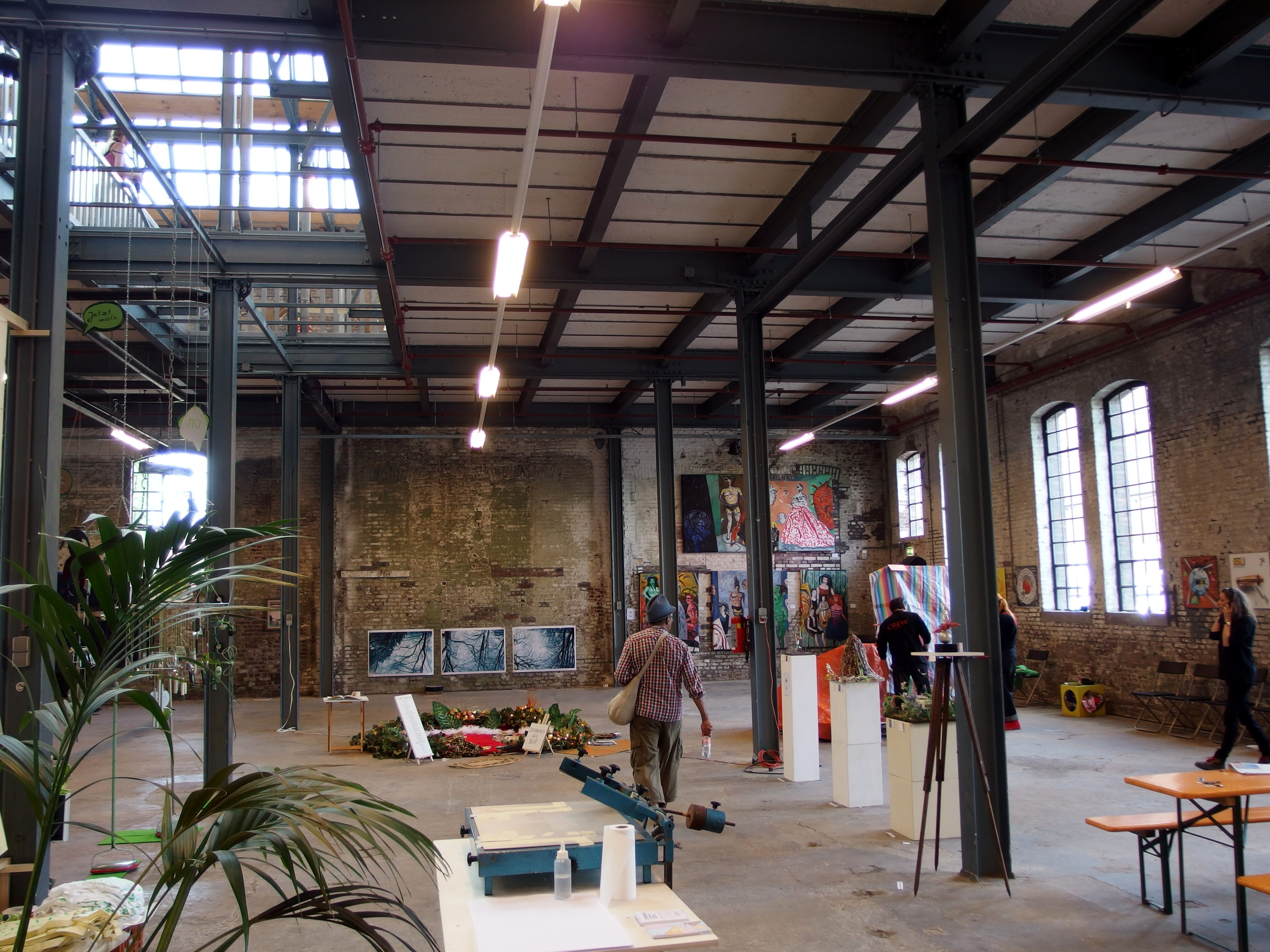
2014 in Maastricht; Timmerfabriek

KunstTour was a yearly art festival in Maastricht, Netherlands. During the weekend of the festival, which was usually in spring, a lot of galleries and workshops opened their doors to the public for free. Artists then got the chance to expose their work, and the visitors could see the workplaces of the artists. Visitors travelled to different locations on a free bus.

KunstTour was organized by Art2Connect, with financial support from the City of Maastricht, the Province of Limburg (Netherlands), Ateliers Maastricht and Businesslife.

== Editions ==
The year 2005 was a controversial edition for the KunstTour. The main location that year was a squatter's house. The opening took place on the Friday night, with officials of local and provincial government, when a party started. At 3 o'clock in the morning, the party was stopped by police because they didn't have proper permission for the property.

In 2006 the KunstTour took place May 19-21. The main location was the Statenkwartier (in the centre of Maastricht), with the filmhouse Lumière as the central point. The theme was Urban Myths.

In 2007 the KunstTour took place May 26-28.

The final edition of the KunstTour took place June 2-5, 2017. In November of the same year, Art2Connect and organiser Bert Lemmers announced that the KunstTour would no longer continue.
