= Bethlehem Castle =

Castle in Maastricht, Netherlands

Coordinates: 50°52′4″N 5°42′40″E

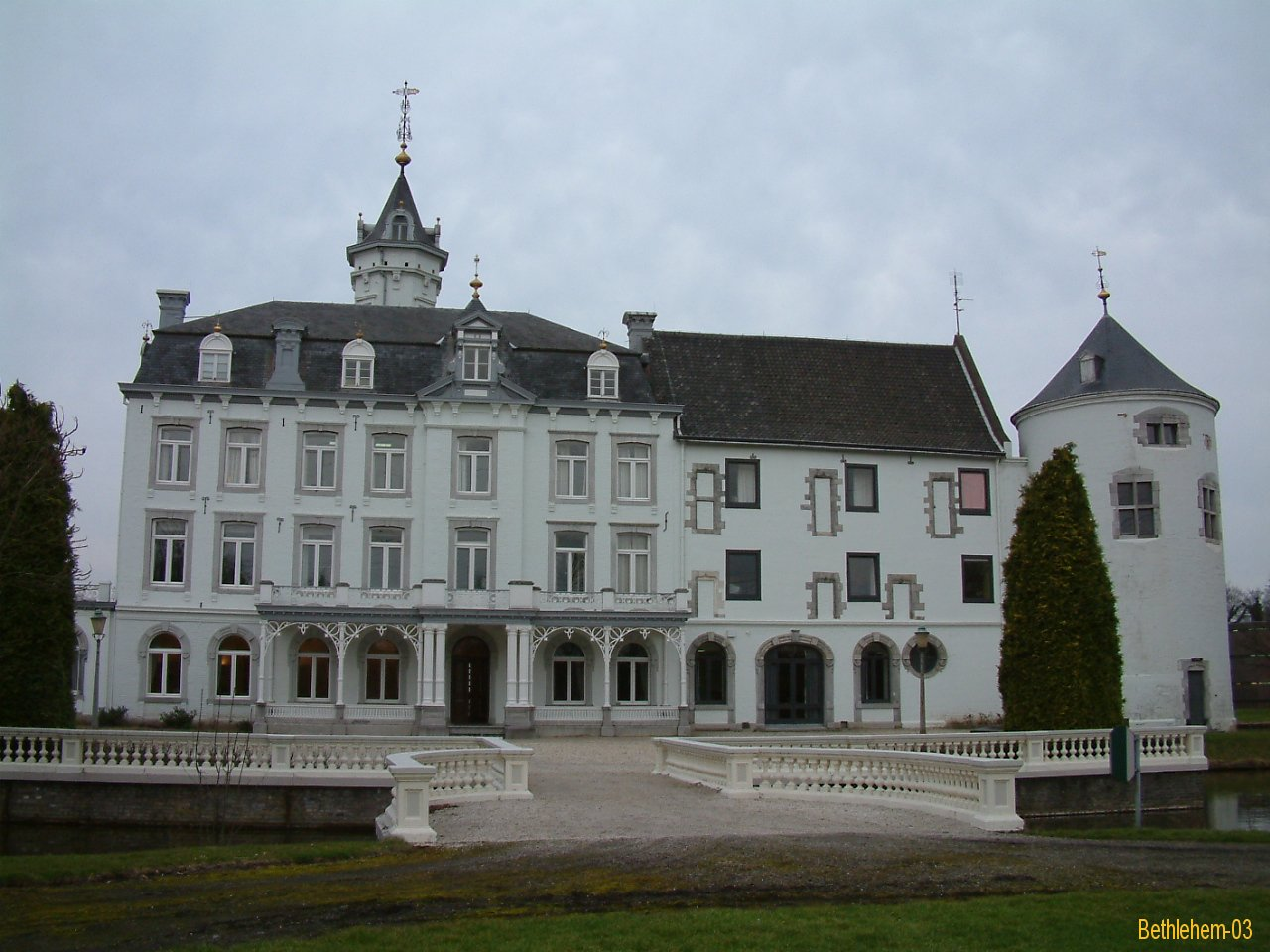
Bethlehem Castle

Bethlehem Castle is a castle in Maastricht, in the south of the Netherlands. It was built in the 12th century. It is one of the oldest castles in the Netherlands. Nowadays it serves as a hotel and as part of the Maastricht Hotel Management School.
